= Chemical generation =

The Chemical Generation refers to a collection of writers in the 1990s who created work responding to the hedonistic ecstasy and rave culture of the era. Irvine Welsh's book Trainspotting is often described as inciting the movement. The Chemical Generation created DJ-led literature where the key aspiration was authenticity. Stylistically, texts recreated the characteristic rhythms of rave music. Welsh said that he wrote in Scottish vernacular because he "...just liked the beat, the 4/4 beat. The English language is weights and measures - controlling, imperialistic - and I don't want to be controlled".

Notable writers in the genre include Welsh, Roddy Doyle, Alan Warner, John King, Jeff Noon, Nicholas Blincoe, Gordon Legge and Laura Hird - all of whom participated in the survey of the scene carried by Steve Redhead for the publishers of Rebel Inc., Canongate, in his book Repetitive Beat Generation,. The book's title refers to the derogatory 'repetitive beats' label given to ecstasy culture by the government of the time and the Beat Generation which preceded it. Welsh points to the frequency of reading appearing alongside DJs, and often being performed in clubs, as an echo of the Beats.

Key works include Irvine Welsh's Ecstasy and Daren King's Boxy an Star. The concept of a group of writers addressing drug culture was further developed in 1997 by Sarah Champion, whose Disco Biscuits became the UK's bestselling fiction anthology of all time. In addition to the authors listed above the book was notable for the inclusion of writers such as Alex Garland, Bill Drummond, Will Self, Grant Morrison, Esther Freud, Douglas Coupland, Neal Stephenson, Poppy Z. Brite and Robert Anton Wilson.

As the relevance of club culture decreased with a return to guitar-based bands, the writers moved onto other projects. They often appear in 2000's New Puritans anthology. Their style and approach have been mirrored among later British writers such as Richard Milward and Michael Smith.
