= Zembla (magazine) =

British literary and arts magazine

Zembla was a literary and arts magazine published in London for nine issues between 2003 and 2005.

== Background ==
The editor was Dan Crowe, publisher Simon Finch and the designer was Vince Frost. The magazine's title came from Vladimir Nabokov's novel Pale Fire, in which the narrator Charles Kinbote styles himself the last king of Zembla, a fictional northern country.

One of the notable features was The Dead Interview, in which a modern writer offered an imaginary conversation with a deceased cultural figure. Subjects included Marcel Duchamp ('interviewed' by Michel Faber), Jimi Hendrix (Rick Moody), Harry Houdini (Mark Leyner), Henry James (Cynthia Ozick), Samuel Johnson (David Mitchell), Friedrich Nietzsche (Geoff Dyer) and Robert Louis Stevenson (Louise Welsh). Several of these were compiled into a book, published by Granta in 2013.

Several of the contributors were associated with the New Puritans movement, including Nicholas Blincoe, Daren King, Toby Litt, Scarlett Thomas and Matt Thorne.

Other contributors included Jake Arnott, Paul Auster, David Baddiel, Simon Beattie, Manolo Blahnik, John Byrne, Brian Eno, Helen Fielding, Tibor Fischer, Jonathan Safran Foer, Bongani Madondo, Tim Footman, Russell Hoban, Barry Humphries, Siri Hustvedt, A. L. Kennedy, Matthew Kneale, Hari Kunzru, Hanif Kureishi, JT LeRoy, Robert Macfarlane, Stephen Merchant, ZZ Packer, Harold Pinter, Nicholas Royle, James Scudamore, Will Self, Tilda Swinton, Rachel Weisz and Dr Mortimer's Observations.

The magazine closed in October 2005.
