= Perins School =

Location
- Pound Hill; New Alresford, Hampshire, SO24 9BS; England; 51.0889°N 1.1665°W

Information
- Type: Comprehensive; Academy
- Motto: In Omnia Excellentia
- Established: 1696
- Founder: Henry Perin
- Specialist: Sports College
- Department for Education URN: 137128 Tables
- Ofsted: Reports
- Executive Headteacher: Claire Copeland
- Head of School: Lex Western
- Gender: Coeducational
- Age: 11 to 16
- Enrolment: 1,017
- Houses: Terra, Ventus, Aqua, Ignis
- Colours: Blue & White (House Colours - Red, Yellow, Green, Purple)
- Website: www.perins.net

Perins School (formerly named Perins Community School and Perin's Grammar School) is a comprehensive co-educational academy, sports college and secondary school in New Alresford, Hampshire, England. The school was founded in 1696 by Henry Perin.

== Performance ==
Perins has been a well performing school, achieving GCSE pass rates well above the national average. 72% of pupils obtained five or more GCSES grade C or above including maths and English in 2009, compared with the national average of 47.6%. In 2000, OFSTED reported that pupils' attainment had risen from "above average" to "well above average". In the 2010 OFSTED inspection report it was given outstanding status. In 2013, it was given good status. This status has been maintained since, with the latest report in 2022.

== Houses ==
The houses used to be named after space shuttles.

- Challenger
- Discovery
- Endeavour

However, in 2016, the new headteacher (Steve Jones) added a new house and changed the names of the existing ones. The changes and addition are as follows:

- Ignis house (fire in Latin) formerly Endeavour (red)
- Terra house (earth in Latin) formerly Challenger (green)
- Ventus house (wind in Latin) formerly Discovery (yellow)
- Aqua house (water in Latin) the new house (purple)

== Buildings ==
=== Seven main buildings ===
- Pascal: (Media and English classrooms and the LRC/library)
- Eliot: (Art, ICT and MFL classrooms, as well as the main staff room and other offices) - Eliot and Pascal were built in the 70s.
- Rousseau: The original school house (Humanities & PSHE classrooms, as well as the site management)
- Ibsen: (PE Office, General Offices & Child Development)
- Nightingale (Formally Newton): (Science 'laboratories '/classrooms and Prep rooms)
- Stephenson: (Technology Rooms (Design & Food Tech.) Science Labs & a Psychology Classroom)
- The buildings' names are combined to create the acronym of the school's name, PERINS, and are consequentially in order as you move from the top to the bottom of the school.
- Turing: A new block behind Evolution, was built to accommodate the growing maths department. Upon completing the new building, Pascal became entirely for the English department, construction began in late 2013 and was finished by the Summer Term of 2014.
- Hammerstein & The Hubs (Music Practice & Teaching Rooms & Drama Studio)

=== Other buildings ===
- Sports Complex: (The gym, the dance studio and the PE theory classroom)
- School office: (The senior management staff have their offices here, as well as the main office and the photocopying room)
- Sports Hall: To the back of Stephenson, there is an additional building which holds what is known as the sports hall (this is where examinations and other events/activities are held, in addition to sporting activities)

== Management ==
=== Head of School ===
As of September 2026, Lex Western stands as an Interim Head of School, following the Retirement of Mr Mark Nevola. Claire Copeland stands as the Executive Headteacher following the departure of Former Head and CEO of the VITA MAT, Mr Steven Jones.

=== Other Senior Leaders ===
As of September 2026, the school has 3 known Assistant Headteachers, Including Mrs Rowe, Amy Craig and Chris Rait.

== Feeder schools ==
Cheriton Primary, Four Marks Primary, Ropley Primary, Preston Candover Primary, Sun Hill Junior School and Medstead Primary feed into Perins School.

== Sexual assault case ==
In 2025, a former teacher at the school was found by the Teaching Regulatory Agency to have sexually assaulted a pupil at the school in 2018. He was banned from teaching.

== Notable alumni ==
- Gina Beck, West End musical leading lady
- Alexa Chung, television presenter, former model, fashionista.
- Chris Geere, actor on BBC Drama series Waterloo Road playing the role of Matt Wilding.
- Kerry Howard, comedy actress and sister of Russell Howard, performed as Laura in the popular BBC Three comedy series Him & Her and Vicki in the 2009 BBC One sitcom Reggie Perrin.
- Russell Howard, stand up comedian Russell Howard's Good News and regular on BBC comedy series Mock the Week.
- Dan Kieran, author (Crap Towns) and travel journalist for The Times
- Derek Warwick Formula One racing driver
