= Vernacular literature =

Literature written in the vernacular language

Vernacular literature is literature written in the vernacular—the speech of the "common people".

In the European tradition, this effectively means literature not written in Latin or Koine Greek. In this context, vernacular literature appeared during the Middle Ages at different periods in the various countries; the earliest European vernacular literatures are Irish literature (the earliest being Tochmarc Emire (10th century), transcribed from a lost manuscript of the 8th century), Welsh literature, English literature and Gothic literature.

The Italian poet Dante Alighieri, in his De vulgari eloquentia, was possibly the first European writer to argue cogently for the promotion of literature in the vernacular. Important early vernacular works include Dante's Divine Comedy, Giovanni Boccaccio's Decameron (both in Italian), John Barbour's The Brus (in Scots), Geoffrey Chaucer's Canterbury Tales (in Middle English) and Jacob van Maerlant's Spieghel Historiael (in Middle Dutch). Indeed, Dante's work contributed to the development of the Italian language. Leonardo Da Vinci used vernacular in his work. Dante set out the case for the vernacular in De vulgari eloquentia (On Eloquence in the Vernacular), a treatise written in Latin between about 1304 and 1307 and left unfinished. In its first book he distinguishes the vernacular languages, which he considers superior because they are natural, from grammatica, the learned language, and then surveys the dialects of Italy in search of an "illustrious" vernacular fit for literary use. His Divine Comedy, written in Italian around 1308 to 1321, put the argument into practice, and its use of the vernacular rather than Latin ensured that the poem reached a wider audience.

The term is also applied to works not written in the standard and/or prestige language of their time and place. For example, many authors in Scotland, such as James Kelman and Edwin Morgan, have used Scots, even though English is now the more common language of publishing in Scotland. Ngũgĩ wa Thiong'o wrote in his native Gikuyu language, though he previously wrote in English. Some authors have written in invented vernacular; examples of such novels include the futuristic literary novels Boxy an Star by Daren King and A Clockwork Orange by Anthony Burgess.

== Outside Europe ==
By extension, the term is also used to describe, for example, Chinese literature not written in classical Chinese and Indian literature after Sanskrit. In the Indian culture, traditionally religious or scholarly works were written in Prakrit, Tamil and Sanskrit. With the rise of the Bhakti movement from the 8th century on-wards, religious works began to be created in Kannada, and Telugu, and from the 12th Century onward in many other Indian languages throughout the different regions of India. For example, the Ramayana, one of Hinduism's sacred epics in Sanskrit, had vernacular versions such as Ramacharitamanasa, an Awadhi version of the Ramayana by the 16th century poet Tulsidas. In China, the New Culture Movement of the 1910s–20s promoted vernacular literature.

In the Philippines, the term means any written literature in a language other than Filipino (or Tagalog) or English. At present, it forms the second largest corpus of literature, following the literature in Tagalog. During the Spanish colonial era, when Filipino did not yet exist as a national lingua franca, literature in this type flourished. Aside from religious literature, such as the Passiong Mahal (the Passion of Our Lord), zarzuelas were also produced using the Philippine vernacular languages.

In Arabic, vernacular literature refers to works written in dialects of Arabic as opposed to Classical Arabic or Modern Standard Arabic. For the Egyptian dialect authors include Ahmed Fouad Negm, Muhammad Husayn Haykal, and Salah Jahin. There is also a wave of modern writers.

== See also ==
- Medieval literature
- Creole languages
