= Corpsing (novel) =

2000 novel by Toby Litt

- Author: Toby Litt
- Genre: Novel
- Publisher: Hamish Hamilton
- Publication date: 2000
- Pages: 373
- ISBN: 0-24-114069-2
- OCLC: 473721357
- Preceded by: Beatniks (1997)
- Followed by: deadkidsongs (2001)

Corpsing is a crime thriller by British writer Toby Litt published in 2000.

== Plot summary ==
Conrad is a television producer who, whilst having lunch with his ex-girlfriend Lily, witnesses her murder and is shot himself by an anonymous assailant. The rest of the novel centres on Conrad's attempts to uncover the identity of Lily's killer and to discover the reasons for her murder.

== Reception ==
The book received positive reviews.
