= Tony White (writer) =

British novelist, writer and editor (born 1964)

Tony White (born 1964 in Farnham, Surrey) is a British novelist, writer and editor. Best known for his novel Foxy-T (Faber, 2003), described by Toby Litt in 2006 as his 'favourite British novel from the past ten years', White has been called a 'serious, engaging voice of the modern city'. Since 2010, he has been chair of London's arts radio station Resonance FM.

== Fiction ==
White's first novels Road Rage (Low Life Books, 1997), Satan Satan Satan (Attack Books!, 1999), and Charlieunclenorfolktango (Codex, 1999) – 'bizarre, depressing and unreadable' – have been located on the ‘marginal terrain of avant-pulp’, where writers such as Stewart Home and Victor Headley 'channel the energy and drive of pornography, the skinhead paperbacks of Richard Allen and the cartoon anarchism of Leo Baxendale's Beano comics to escape the stylistic and rhetorical corsets of the metropolitan novel.'. In 2006 the Russian publisher, T-ough Press faced criminal prosecution for publishing Russian language translations of Satan Satan Satan and Road Rage.

Both the title and the triangular relationship at the heart of Foxy-T recall D. H. Lawrence's 1922 novella The Fox, but it was White's use of a hybridised, street language of London's East End in which the novel is entirely written, which drew most attention. Some reviewers referred to it as ‘broken, rhythmic patois’, or ‘Benglish’, and White was interviewed about his use of language by Ed Stourton on Radio 4's Today programme. White himself has written that it was the

language that I was hearing all around me in east London at the time, where white, Asian and other mainly (but not exclusively) young people were adopting or hybridising Black British language and in so doing were disrupting what had been the very necessary identity politics of the 1970s and 80s: a disruption typified for me by young Bangladeshi rudeboys calling each other ‘Rasta’ and most easily illustrated by the fact that it became impossible to determine the ethnicity of an unseen speaker (e.g. someone sitting behind you on the bus) by the sound of their voice.

White's novella, Dicky Star and the Garden Rule (Forma, 2012), was commissioned to accompany a series of works by the artists Jane and Louise Wilson reflecting upon the 25th anniversary of the Chernobyl disaster. Set in Leeds it was written using an Oulipo-style constraint, in this case a 'mandated vocabulary,' with each daily chapter told using all of the answers to the Guardian Quick Crossword from that day in 1986.

Another novella, Missorts Volume II (Situations, 2012) was published as a free ebook to accompany White's Missorts app, a permanent, GPS-triggered, immersive soundwork for mobile phones that is activated in the Redcliffe area of Bristol as a public art work. Missorts Volume II follows the lives of four characters affected by a derelict former Royal Mail sorting office adjacent to Bristol Temple Meads railway station.

White co-edited the short story collection Croatian Nights (Serpent's Tail, 2005), with Borivoj Radaković and Matt Thorne, which featured both British, Croatian and Serbian authors, and Britpulp! (Sceptre, 1999). His own short stories have appeared in various periodicals, exhibition catalogues and collections including All Hail the New Puritans (4th Estate), edited by Nicholas Blincoe and Matt Thorne.

The 2018 novel The Fountain in the Forest opens in the form of a modern police procedural but White includes throughout a mandated vocabulary (in the style of the Oulipo movement) to reflect particular episodes of recent social history. Phantom at the Feast, the sequel to The Fountain in the Forest, was published in June 2026.

== Other work ==
In 2006, White's Another Fool in the Balkans: In the Footsteps of Rebecca West (Cadogan, 2006) was published; a travelogue 'from Belgrade to Split, reporting the words of a people confused by shame, pride and hope, trying to make sense of brutal murder and hatred, managing to create something universally valuable from their lives and their history' in the post-Yugoslav republics.

White has been writer in residence at the Science Museum, from which came the story Albertopolis Disparu (Science Museum, 2009), and the Leverhulme Trust writer in residence at the UCL School of Slavonic and East European Studies. In 2010 he collaborated with Blast Theory to write Ivy4evr, an SMS-based, interactive drama for young people broadcast by Channel 4 in October 2010, which was nominated for a British Interactive Media Association (BIMA)award in 2011.

In 1994, White founded artist's book imprint Piece of Paper Press, and has invited artists and writers, (including Liliane Lijn, Pavel Büchler, Tim Etchells, Elizabeth Magill, and Alison Turnbull) to create books made from a single sheet of A4 paper, folded three times, stapled and cut to produce an A7, 16-page, photocopied edition. Several of these artists' books are included within Arnolfini's collection of artists' books held at Bristol Archives. He was Arts Council England Interdisciplinary Arts Officer between 1999 and 2007, overseeing the Pioneers in Art and Science DVD series, working particularly closely with UK film director Ken McMullen and the artist Gustav Metzger. Between 1998 and 2007, White was literary editor of The Idler magazine.
