= Zembla =

Zembla may refer to:

- Zembla (magazine), a British literary magazine published from 2003 to 2005
- Zembla (TV series), a Dutch documentary television series
- Zembla, a fictional kingdom appearing in Vladimir Nabokov's 1962 novel Pale Fire
- ZEMBLA is one of five tracks written by Philippe Saisse for Japanese drummer Senri Kawaguchi's 2016 album Cider - Hard and Sweet.

== See also ==
- Nova Zembla (disambiguation)
