= Jonathan Jones (journalist) =

British journalist and art critic

- Born: Wales
- Education: University of Cambridge
- Occupations: Art critic, The Guardian
- Spouse: Married
- Children: 1 daughter

Jonathan Jones is a British art critic who has written for The Guardian since 1999. He has appeared in the BBC television series Private Life of a Masterpiece and in 2009 was a judge for the Turner Prize. He has also been a judge for the BP Portrait Award.

== Early life ==
Jones was born in Wales, and was brought up in North Wales. Both his parents were school teachers and the family visited Italy in the summer holidays, which kindled his interest in art. He studied history at the University of Cambridge and, at one time, wanted to be a professional historian. Jones developed an interest in modern art while living in the United States, where his wife was an academic at Brown University. On his return to the United Kingdom, he wrote freelance for magazines and art features for The Guardian.

== Journalism ==
=== On Mark Leckey ===
Jones had a public feud with artist Mark Leckey, who won the Turner Prize in 2008. By 2011, Whitehot Magazine referred to "the ongoing 3-year battle" between the two. Later that year, Jones gave a highly negative review to Leckey's exhibition at the Serpentine Gallery, describing it as being "full of lumbering inanities".

The review provoked strong responses in art circles and close to 300 comments on The Guardian's web page, including some 30 replies from Jones. Jones said in one: "So here is where I am really coming from... I believe ninety-five percent of the British contemporary art that is endlessly promoted by galleries, museums and the media is worthless". Writing in frieze, Isobel Harbison called the review part of a "trend in broadsheet art criticism of opinion-mongering and reader-goading."

=== On Terry Pratchett ===
In August 2015, shortly after the death of Terry Pratchett, Jones wrote an article titled "Get real. Terry Pratchett is not a literary genius", criticising Pratchett's books as "ordinary potboilers" not worth the time to read. The piece attracted criticism including a response by Sam Jordison on The Guardian's book blog, which defended Pratchett's work and criticised Jones for commenting on books despite admitting that he had not read them. Jones wrote a follow-up piece after reading Small Gods, in which he referred to his initial column as his "most shameful moment as a critic". He praised some of the book's wit and entertainment value, but still found that its prose and characters fell short of what he considered literary fiction.

=== On Grayson Perry ===
Jones is a long-standing critic of Grayson Perry, whom he has described as "trite and shallow". Perry responded by quoting "Johnathan Jones" on a pot in his 2017 exhibition.

=== On Rolf Harris ===
Following Rolf Harris's criminal conviction in 2014, Jones was highly critical of his abilities as an artist, saying, "In the case of Harris, I would be happy to see all his art destroyed, but I already felt that way back in 2005. Even as a child, I found his art on television soporific. He was never a good artist and it's too late for collectors of his work to say they feel duped now – they were suckers to fall for such worthless cultural detritus in the first place." He added, "My blood is starting to boil all over again as I think about that glimpse into an era of lies. Seriously, what cultural malaise was this?"

=== On Tracey Emin ===
In 2014, Jones described "the middlebrow" as "inherently corrupt", continuing, "What goes on in Tracey Emin's bed is far more honest, far more decent, than what has gone on in the name of bland entertainment and mild art [...] Chocolate box art is a lie."

=== On photography ===
Jones has expressed varying opinions on photography. In January 2013 he wrote that "Photography is the serious art of our time" and the only art that devotes the same "attention to the stuff that matters" as great artists of the past. In December 2014, prompted by the high price allegedly paid for a print by the photographer Peter Lik, Jones stated "Photography is not an art", and went on to say that, "this hollow and overblown creation exposes the illusion that lures us all, when we're having a good day with a good camera – the fantasy that taking a picture is the same thing as making a work of art."

== Publications ==
- The lost battles: Leonardo, Michelangelo and the artistic duel that defined the Renaissance. Knopf, 2012. ISBN 0307594750
- The loves of the artists: Art and passion in the Renaissance. Simon & Schuster, 2013. ISBN 0857203207
- Sensations: The Story of British Art from Hogarth to Banksy. Laurence King Publishing, 2019. ISBN 9781786272973
- Earthly Delights: A History of the Renaissance. Thames & Hudson, 2023. ISBN 9780500023136

== Personal life ==
Jones is married, with one daughter, and lives in London.
