= Oei Oei Oei (Dat Was Me Weer Een Loei) =

1969 song performed by Johan Cruyff

Single by Johan Cruyff
- B-side: "Alle Stoppen Ineens Naar De Knoppen"
- Released: 1969
- Genre: Levenslied
- Length: 3:02
- Label: Polydor
- Songwriter: P. Koelewijn
- Producer: Peter Koelewijn

Oei Oei Oei (Dat Was Me Weer Een Loei) is a song by Johan Cruyff. It is the only song the association football star ever released, and it was written by Peter Koelewijn.

An approximate translation of the title is "Oh, oh, oh, yet another blow". It is about going to see a cousin first lose a boxing match, then going with him to the pub where he gets short-changed, and finally accompanying him home where he is confronted by his angry wife.

== History ==
According to the producer, at first Johan could not sing well, since he had no sense of rhythm and was feeling quite nervous. After a while, the football player managed to relax with the help of alcohol, and afterwards, the single was recorded. Shortly after Cruyff moved to Spain, Koelewijn wanted to release the song in this country as well. The disc was released with the help of Polydor Records. In Spain, Cruyff's single was even more popular than in the Netherlands.
