= Roy Chubby Brown =

English comedian (born 1945)

- Born: Royston Vasey; 3 February 1945 (age 81); Grangetown, North Riding of Yorkshire, England
- Spouses: Judith Armstrong (m. 1967; div. 1969); Sandra Pallent (m. 1988, divorced); Helen Coulson (m. 2001)

Comedy career
- Years active: 1960s–present
- Genres: Blue comedy, insult comedy, political satire, sarcasm, self-deprecation
- Subjects: British politics, sex, celebrities, culture, one liners
- Website: roychubbybrown.biz

Royston Vasey (born 3 February 1945), better known professionally as Roy Chubby Brown, is an English comedian. His act consists of offensive humour, high profanity and outspoken disdain for political correctness.

== Early life ==
Roy Chubby Brown was born Royston Vasey on 3 February 1945 in Grangetown, Middlesbrough in the North Riding of Yorkshire He left school without any qualifications, leaving home at the age of fourteen, spent time living rough and moving from job to job, at one point joining the Merchant Navy. He became homeless and for some time slept in a fishing boat in Redcar. He was arrested and taken to a detention centre and then on to borstal, following which he went to prison.

Whilst in prison, Vasey read I Owe Russia $1200 by Bob Hope, which made him decide he wanted to be a stand-up comic. When he saw Ken Dodd perform live, he thought he was so good it inspired him to try comedy himself.

Vasey formed a comedy duo with a fellow ex-Pipelines band member. The duo named themselves Alcock and Brown, as they shared surnames with the pilots of the first transatlantic flight, wearing goggles during their performance. The group eventually disbanded, with Vasey continuing as a comedic act by himself; however the goggles stayed, and became a permanent part of his image.

In 1971, Vasey's manager at the time (George Forster), asked him whether he would try performing blue comedy, to which he agreed. He then took to the stage and said, "Good evening! My wife's got two cunts and I'm one of them." Vasey has said he was nearly beaten up, but that following that performance: "I knew I had something. I took the building site mentality and banter and took it to the stage. I was the first person ever to say the 'C' word on stage in the UK. To be honest, I never looked back."

== Career ==
Vasey appeared on the UK television talent show New Faces as Roy Chubby Brown in the 1970s, coming second to a country and western band. He failed the audition for another television talent show, Opportunity Knocks, after saying the word 'arse' during his interview.

=== Comedy ===
Brown's image is characterised by a clown-like stage costume consisting of a leather flying helmet and goggles, a white shirt, a red bow tie and moccasin slippers, and a multi-coloured patchwork suit (previously made from beer mats because stag night crowds would shower him in beer).

His comedy is controversial: it frequently makes fun of racial and ethnic minorities, women, and homosexuals, and described as blue comedy, insult comedy, political satire, sarcasm, and self-deprecation. In 2023, he lamented "I remember when white people made fucking adverts on the TV".

He eventually began to perform at larger venues, reaching 500,000 people in the UK per year. His breakthrough came in 1990 when PolyGram Video signed him to a home video contract and the video release of From Inside the Helmet. He would release concerts annually every Christmas including The Helmet Rides Again and The Helmet's Last Stand which sold a combined 750,000 units, generating revenue of £9 million.

=== Film ===
In 1993, Brown released U.F.O., a science fiction film in which he featured along with Roger Lloyd-Pack and Sara Stockbridge. It was reviewed poorly, with Empire magazine calling the film "a stand-up show, allowing the comedian to tell his sexist jokes to a race of aliens who charge him for being a misogynist" and rating it 1/5.

In 2012, Brown voiced a talking lamp post in Robin Sheppard's film adaptation of Richard Milward's novel Apples. He also played the Victorian Photographer in the feature film Unconditional (titled Unconditional Love in the USA) directed by Bryn Higgins.

=== Television ===
Due to the controversial nature of his act, Brown's shows are rarely seen on television, however, a programme called Roy Chubby Brown: Britain's Rudest Comedian was broadcast on Channel 4 in May 2007.

Brown appeared in Series 2 of The League of Gentlemen as Larry Vaughn, mayor of the fictional town of Royston Vasey. The town's name comes from Brown's birth name. Vaughn's name, conversely, comes from the name of the mayor of the town in the American horror film Jaws.

=== Music ===
One of his best-known songs is "Living Next Door to Alice (Who the Fuck is Alice?)", a cover version of "Living Next Door to Alice", recorded with Smokie. The record spent 27 weeks in the UK Singles Chart, selling 400,000 copies and peaking at number 3 in October 1995. He released a solo single in the winter of 1996 called "A Rocking Good Christmas", written by Ray Hedges; this reached number 51. Brown has also released two albums, Take Fat and Party (1995) and Fat Out of Hell (1996); they achieved positions 29 and 67 in the UK Albums Chart respectively.

== Personal life ==
Vasey has seven children from three marriages. He met his current wife Helen in Scarborough in the late 1990s, and lives with her and their two children in Tetney, Lincolnshire.

Vasey was diagnosed with throat cancer in 2002 and had a vocal cord removed.

In 2006, he released an autobiography titled Common as Muck: The Autobiography of Roy 'Chubby' Brown. In December 2011, he self-published a collection of memoirs from his life and career called It's Funny Being Me.

Vasey is a supporter of Middlesbrough Football Club. He is a co-owner of the racehorse Rasaman.

In 2003, Vasey was fined £200 in Blackpool for assaulting a heckler by pulling him from his seat, dragging him across the floor and proceeding to attack him with a golf umbrella. Brown later claimed, "I just wanted the man to stop swearing and being abusive in front of women and children who were on the pier."

In 2009, Vasey was charged with assaulting a 21-year-old pregnant woman in a supermarket car park, but acquitted after the judge ruled due to the "poor quality of the CCTV footage, we are not convinced beyond reasonable doubt that Mr Vasey is guilty of the offence".

Throughout 2014, Vasey was fined for traffic offences on several occasions, including reading The Sun newspaper whilst driving on the A19 road in North Yorkshire.

== Live performance releases ==
Brown's live shows have been distributed by Channel 5 Video (1990), PolyGram Video (1991–1998), Universal Pictures (UK) Ltd (1999–2017) and independently (2019–2025). Brown's live shows have been released on VHS (1990–2005), DVD (2000–2025) and Blu-ray (2010).
Standing Room Only (2003) to Hangs Up the Helmet (2015) were released on CD, with Thunder Bollocks (2000) later being issued on CD as well. Some sporadic 1990s–2000s releases were released on cassette as well, up until Standing Room Only (2002).

The following titles were banned by the Irish film censor:

- U.F.O.
  7 February 1994 (cinema)
  29 April 1994 (video)
- Jingle Bollocks
  30 September 1994 (video)
- Saturday Night Beaver
  15 November 1996 (video)
- Chubby Goes Down Under and Other Sticky Regions
  4 June 1999 (video)
- Stocking Filler
  7 September 2001 (video)

=== Releases ===
==== Stand-up ====
Title	Format	Catalog number	Year of release	Additional notes
From Inside the Helmet	VHS/DVD (2009)	CFV 11412	18 November 1990	First overall title First title to be released on VHS. Only title to be released by Channel 5 Video.
The Helmet Rides Again	VHS/DVD (2001)	083 622 3	18 September 1991	First title to be released by PolyGram Video.
The Helmet's Last Stand	VHS/Video CD (1995)/DVD (2004)	086 416 3	16 November 1992	
Jingle Bollocks	VHS/DVD (2000)	632 724 3	14 November 1994	
Clitoris Allsorts	VHS/DVD (2001)	635 936 3	6 November 1995	
Saturday Night Beaver	VHS/DVD (2000)	043 454 3	11 November 1996	
Chubby Goes Down Under and Other Sticky Regions	VHS/DVD (2000)	057 068 3 PG 1208	21 September 1998	Last title to be released by PolyGram Video – this is due to Seagram (Universal's then-parent company) purchasing PolyGram Filmed Entertainment for £6.5 billion.
You Fat Bastard!	VHS/DVD (2000)	061 611 9	11 November 1999	First title to be released by Universal Pictures (UK) Ltd.
Thunder Bollocks	VHS/DVD/CD (2006)	902 101 3; 078 066 2	13 November 2000	First title to be initially released on DVD. Only title to not receive a CD release until 2006. This title was originally going to be called Ginger Minge, but because the BBFC intervened due to "titles that may cause offence by their public display", the title had to be changed.
Stocking Filler!	VHS/DVD	904 019 3; 078 405 2	11 November 2001	
Standing Room Only	VHS/DVD/CD	907 357 3; 903 131 9	11 November 2002	First title to be released on CD.
Bad Taste	VHS/DVD/CD	820 893 0; 820 893 1	10 November 2003	
Giggling Lips	VHS/DVD/CD	822 609 1; 822 609 2	8 November 2004	
King Thong	VHS/DVD/CD	823 602 4; 823 602 5	7 November 2005	Last title to be released on VHS.
Kick-Arse Chubbs	DVD/CD	824 497 9	6 November 2006	
The Good, The Bad And The Fat Bastard	DVD/CD	825 058 5	5 November 2007	
Dirty Weekend in Blackpool	DVD/CD	825 562 3	3 November 2008	
Too Fat To Be Gay	DVD/CD	827 207 0	9 November 2009	
Pussy & Meatballs	DVD/Blu-ray/CD	827 793 3; 828 086 7	22 November 2010	Only title to be released on Blu-ray.
Front Page Boobs	DVD/CD	829 032 7	12 November 2012	
Who Ate All The Pies?	DVD/CD	829 626 7	18 November 2013	
Don't Get Fit! Get Fat!	DVD/CD	830 124 7	24 November 2014	
Hangs Up the Helmet	DVD/CD	830 524 1	16 November 2015	Last title to be released on CD.
The Second Coming	DVD	831 272 9	20 November 2017	Last title to be released by Universal Pictures (UK) Ltd.
50 Shades of Brown	DVD	N/A	19 November 2019	First title to be released independently.
Harmless Vulgarity And Friendly Smut	DVD	N/A	3 August 2022	
No Foul Language	DVD	N/A	17 November 2023	
Last Orders	DVD	N/A	19 January 2025	
It's Just A Laugh	DVD	N/A	15 December 2025	Final overall title. Last title to be released on DVD. Last title to be released independently.

==== Films ====
Title	Format	Catalog number	Year of release	Additional notes
Exposed	VHS/DVD (2008)	088 676 3	1 November 1993	Only mockumentary.
U.F.O.	VHS/DVD (2002)	630 050 3 PG 1014	10 October 1994	Only film.
Up Close And Personal	DVD	N/A	24 November 2014	Only documentary.

==== Compilations ====
Title	Format	Catalog number	Year of release	Additional notes
Obscene and Not Heard	VHS/DVD (2001)	047 618 3	27 October 1997	Only compilation title to be released by PolyGram Video.
Triple XXX	DVD boxset	907 012 1	11 November 2002	First DVD Boxset
Comedy Box	DVD boxset	824 511 1	6 November 2006	
40 Years Of Fun And Filth	DVD boxset	825 297 2	5 November 2007	
Tasty Threesome	DVD boxset	825 911 0	3 November 2008	
Mucky Man Box	DVD boxset	827 394 5	9 November 2009	
Blue Christmas	DVD boxset	828 088 3	22 November 2010	
Big Fat Bastard Box	DVD boxset	830 203 0	24 November 2014	Last DVD boxset.
Great British Jerk Off	DVD	831 019 0	21 November 2016	Only compilation title to be released by Universal Pictures (UK) Ltd.
From The Vault Bootleg	DVD	N/A	22 March 2021	Only compilation title to be released independently.
