= Gompie =

Dutch band

- Origin: Nijmegen, Netherlands
- Genres: Comedy, parody
- Members: Peter Koelewijn; Rob Peters; Onno Pelser

Gompie was a Dutch band from Nijmegen, which in 1995 edited the Smokie hit "Living Next Door to Alice", adding the words "Alice, who the fuck is Alice!?". The song reached number 1 in the Netherlands and number 17 in the UK. Who the X Is Gompie! is the name of the album they released in 1995.

== Background ==
The song "Living Next Door to Alice" was listened to on a regular basis in café Gompie in Nijmegen. When the name "Alice" had passed, it was common for disk jockey Onno Pelser to turn the volume down, and the entire café would scream "Alice, who the fuck is Alice?". Rob Peters, director of a record company, happened to visit café Gompie one evening and witnessed this show. He approached his friend, singer Peter Koelewijn, and one day later the song was recorded. "Gompie" was chosen as the artist name.

The single became a hit in the Benelux and 80 other countries. In the United Kingdom and the United States, a censored version was released with the name "Alice, who the bleep is Alice?". This charted in Britain (though was less popular than Smokie's own re-recording of the track with Roy 'Chubby' Brown) but made no impact in the US.

Who The X Is Gompie!

Studio album by Gompie
- Released: 1995

== Album ==
Who the X Is Gompie! is the name of the album released by Gompie. The album came after the success of their single "Alice (Who The X Is Alice)", which is featured on this album. The catalogue number for this album is RPC 95542, although it has since been deleted and is very hard to get hold of.

The songs are mainly parodies of songs that were already released. On the obverse of the album under each track listed is the name of the song on which it is based, unless it is an original song.

This album has other interpretations and comical adaptations of hits from other various well-known artists, such as Smokie, Elvis Presley, Monty Python, Bob Dylan, The Animals, and many others. The album contains strong language.

=== Track listing ===
(Album title, Track length, Original song title, if applicable)

1. "Alice (Who The X Is Alice?)" (3:57) ("Living Next Door To Alice")
2. "I Will Survive" (Party Version) (5:01)
3. "Life? You Never Saw My Wife" (3:10) ("Always Look on the Bright Side of Life")
4. "Everybody Needs My Body" (5:04) ("Everybody Needs Somebody to Love")
5. "Muss I Denn/House of the Rising Sun" (3:53) ("Muss I Denn"/"House of the Rising Sun")
6. "Everybody Must Get Stoned" (4:26) ("Rainy Day Women Nos 12 and 35"/"They're Coming to Take Me Away, Ha-Haaa!")
7. "Yes I'm Ready" (4:15) ("Get Ready")
8. "Voulez-Vous Coucher Avec Moi Ce Soir?" (4:10)
9. "Phoney Love" (3:28)
10. "King Knut's Can Can" (3:37)
11. "Black Money" (4;12) ("Black Kisses Never Make You Blue")
12. "Country Party" (3:39)
13. "Who The X Is Gompie?" (3:38)
14. "Tarzan & Heidi" (3:59)

The track titled "Country Party" is a medley of the following songs:

- "Bonanza"
- "(Ghost) Riders in the Sky"
- "Rawhide"
- "Deep in the Heart of Texas"

Although not credited, the track titled "Voulez-Vous Coucher Avec Moi Ce Soir?" is a version of Lady Marmalade. "Muss I Denn" is the original Swabian German title of the song which later became known as "Wooden Heart". "Phoney Love" is a version of "La Bamba".

== Discography ==
=== Albums ===
- Who the X Is Gompie! (1995)

=== Singles ===
- "Alice (Who the X Is Alice?) (Living Next Door to Alice)" (1995) – NED #1, AUS #54, AUT #2, BEL (Fla) #1, BEL (Wal) #36, GER #2, NOR #4, NZ #29, SWI #2, UK #17
- "Tarzan & Heidi" (1995) – BEL (Fla) #30
- "Life? You Never Saw My Wife!" (1995)
- "All I Want for X-Mas Is a Spice Girl" (1997)
- "Hey Baby - Oe Aa" (2000)
