= MNREAD acuity chart =

The MNREAD acuity chart or Minnesota low vision reading chart is a text based chart used to measure near visual acuity in people with normal or low vision. It can also be used to measure maximum reading speed, critical print size and the reading accessibility index of a person. Digital and printed types of charts are available.

The MNREAD chart consists of sentences with print size decreasing by 0.1 log unit steps, from 1.3 logMAR (Snellen equivalent 20/400 at 40 cm) to −0.5 logMAR (Snellen equivalent 20/6). Charts are available in many languages. It allows near visual acuity recording in logMAR notation, Snellen notation or M-units.

== Procedure ==
Since the MNREAD charts use logarithmic pattern of letters, near visual acuity is usually measured at a distance of 40 cm from eyes. For low vision patients, chart can also be used at closer distances. After distance vision correction, near vision is measured with and without near vision correction.

== History ==
Gordon Legge and colleagues introduced the computer based Minnesota low-vision reading test in the year 1989. In 1993, they introduced a simplified printed version of the test. The chart we use now is developed at the Minnesota Laboratory for Low-Vision Research, University of Minnesota, by Gordon Legge, Steve Mansfield, Andrew Luebker, and Kathryn Cunningham.

== See also ==
- Jaeger chart
- Eye chart
