= Simon Lewis (writer) =

British writer (born 1971)

- Born: 1971 (age 54–55); Newport, Monmouthshire, UK
- Occupations: Writer, author
- Writing career
- Genre: Crime fiction

Simon Lewis (born 1971) is a Welsh novelist and screenwriter, born in Newport, Monmouthshire, in 1971. He went to school in Monmouth, then studied Art and Art History at Goldsmiths College in London. After graduation, he travelled extensively in Asia, before beginning work as a travel writer for Rough Guides publishing. He has since worked on five editions of the Rough Guide to China and is sole author of the Rough Guide to Shanghai and the Rough Guide to Beijing.

His first novel, Go, a thriller about backpackers, was written in a village in the Himalayas. It was first published by small press Pulp Books in 1998, but, following favourable press, was picked up by Corgi (1999). It has since been translated into Swedish, German and Italian.

His second novel, Bad Traffic, is a crime thriller about people smugglers. It was published in 2008 by Sort of Books, and in 2009 by Scribner in the US. It has been translated into Swedish, German, Italian, French, Japanese and Turkish.

Simon was selected as one of 21 "writers to watch" at the 2008 the Guardian Hay Festival.

== Bibliography ==
=== Fiction ===
- Bad Traffic, published by Scribner (1998). ISBN 978-1-4165-9604-2
- Go, published by Corgi (2008). ISBN 0-552-14717-6
- Border Run (2012). ISBN 978-0-9563086-5-8

=== Short story ===
- All Hail the New Puritans, a collection of stories edited by Nicholas Blincoe and Matt Thorne, published by Fourth Estate, ISBN 978-1-84115-349-0
- Fortune Hotel, a collection of stories edited by Sarah Champion, published by Penguin Fiction, ISBN 0-14-028108-8

Screen

- The Anomaly
- Jet Trash
- Tiger House
- Four Kids and It

== Awards and nominations ==
- Bad Traffic (Trafic Sordide) has been shortlisted for the Villeneuve les Avignon festival of crime fiction.
- Bad Traffic (Trafic Sordide) was shortlisted for the Prix SNCF du Polar.
- Bad Traffic was shortlisted for the 2008 Los Angeles Times Book Prize (mystery/thriller section)
- Bad Traffic featured in the 2009 world book day "Spread the Word" promotion.
- Bradt Travel Guides travel writing competition finalist in 2006.
