= Guardian First Book Award =

English-language literary award

- Description: Recognizing the best debut book of the year (fiction or non-fiction)
- Country: United Kingdom
- Presented by: The Guardian
- Reward: £10,000
- Website: www.theguardian.com/books/guardianfirstbookaward

The Guardian First Book Award was an annual literary award presented by The Guardian newspaper, recognising a book by a new writer. It was established in 1999, replacing the Guardian Fiction Award or Guardian Fiction Prize that the newspaper had sponsored from 1965. The Guardian First Book Award was discontinued after the 2015 award.

== History ==
The newspaper determined to change its book award after 1998, and during that year also hired Claire Armitstead as literary editor. At the inaugural First Book Award ceremony in 1999, she said that she was informed of the change, details to be arranged, by the head of the marketing department during her second week on the job. "By the time we left the room we had decided on two key things. We would make it a first book award, and we would involve reading groups in the judging process. This was going to be the people's prize." About the opening of the prize to nonfiction she had said in August, "readers do not segregate their reading into fiction or non-fiction, so neither should we." There was no restriction on genre; for example, both poetry and travel would be included in principle, and so would self-published autobiographies.

For the first rendition, 140 books were submitted, including a lot of nonfiction strongest "by far" in "a hybrid of travel-writing and reportage"; weak in science and biography. Experts led by Armitstead selected a longlist of 11 and Borders in Glasgow, London, Brighton and Leeds hosted reading groups that considered one book a week, September to November, and selected a shortlist of six. A panel of eight judges including two Guardian editors chose the winner. The newspaper called it "the first time the ordinary reading public have been involved in the selection of a major literary prize." In the event, the 1999 reading groups selected a shortlist including six novels, and all four groups favoured the novel Ghostwritten by David Mitchell. Their second favourite was one of the travelogue and reporting hybrids, by Philip Gourevitch of The New Yorker. The judges chose the latter, We Wish To Inform You That Tomorrow We Will Be Killed With Our Families —"a horrifying but humane account of the Rwandan genocide, its causes and consequences", the newspaper called it in August.

The prize was worth £10,000 to the winner. Eligible titles were published in English, and in the UK within the calendar year.

== Winners and finalists ==
Guardian First Book Award winners and finalists, 2010-2019
Year	Author	Title	Result
1999	Philip Gourevitch	We Wish to Inform You That Tomorrow We Will Be Killed with Our Families	Winner
1999	Bella Bathurst	Lighthouse Stevensons	Finalist
1999	Raj Kamal Jha	The Blue Bedspread	Finalist
1999	Daren King	Boxy an Star	Finalist
1999	David Mitchell	Ghostwritten	Finalist
1999	Gary Younge	No Place Like Home	Finalist
2000	Zadie Smith	White Teeth	Winner
2000	Mark Z. Danielewski	House of Leaves	Finalist
2000	Dave Eggers	A Heartbreaking Work of Staggering Genius	Finalist
2000	Naomi Klein	No Logo	Finalist
2000	Andrew X. Pham	Catfish and Mandala: a Vietnamese Odyssey	Finalist
2001	Chris Ware	Jimmy Corrigan, the Smartest Kid on Earth	Winner
2001	Miranda Carter	Anthony Blunt: His Lives	Finalist
2001	David Edmonds and John Eidinow	Wittgenstein's Poker: The Story of a Ten-Minute Argument Between Two Great Philosophers	Finalist
2001	Glen David Gold	Carter Beats the Devil	Finalist
2001	Rachel Seiffert	The Dark Room	Finalist
2002	Jonathan Safran Foer	Everything Is Illuminated	Winner
2002	Alexandra Fuller	Don't Let's Go to the Dogs Tonight	Finalist
2002	Hari Kunzru	The Impressionist	Finalist
2002	Oliver Morton	Mapping Mars	Finalist
2002	Sandra Newman	The Only Good Thing Anyone Has Ever Done	Finalist
2003	Robert Macfarlane	Mountains of the Mind	Winner
2003	Monica Ali	Brick Lane	Finalist
2003	Paul Broks	Into the Silent Land	Finalist
2003	Anna Funder	Stasiland	Finalist
2003	DBC Pierre	Vernon God Little	Finalist
2004	Armand Marie Leroi	Mutants: On the Form, Varieties and Errors of Human Body	Winner
2004	David Bezmozgis	Natasha and Other Stories	Finalist
2004	Susanna Clarke	Jonathan Strange & Mr Norrell	Finalist
2004	Matthew Hollis	Ground Water	Finalist
2004	Rory Stewart	The Places in Between	Finalist
2005	Alexander Masters	Stuart: A Life Backwards	Winner
2005	Reza Aslan	No god but God	Finalist
2005	Richard Benson	The Farm	Finalist
2005	Rattawut Lapcharoensap	Sightseeing	Finalist
2005	Suketu Mehta	Maximum City: Bombay Lost and Found	Finalist
2006	Yiyun Li	A Thousand Years of Good Prayers	Winner
2006	Lorraine Adams	Harbor	Finalist
2006	Clare Allan	Poppy Shakespeare	Finalist
2006	Hisham Matar	In the Country of Men	Finalist
2006	Carrie Tiffany	Everyman's Rules for Scientific Living	Finalist
2007	Dinaw Mengestu	Children of the Revolution	Winner
2007	Tahmima Anam	A Golden Age	Finalist
2007	Rajiv Chandrasekaran	Imperial Life in the Emerald City	Finalist
2007	Rosemary Hill	God's Architect	Finalist
2007	Catherine O'Flynn	What Was Lost	Finalist
2008	Alex Ross	The Rest Is Noise: Listening to the 20th Century	Winner
2008	Mohammed Hanif	A Case of Exploding Mangoes	Finalist
2008	Owen Matthews	Stalin's Children	Finalist
2008	Ross Raisin	God's Own Country	Finalist
2008	Steve Toltz	A Fraction of the Whole	Finalist
2009	Petina Gappah	An Elegy for Easterly	Winner
2009	Eleanor Catton	The Rehearsal	Finalist
2009	Samantha Harvey	The Wilderness	Finalist
2009	Reif Larsen	The Selected Works of T.S. Spivet	Finalist
2009	Michael Peel	A Swamp Full of Dollars	Finalist
2010	Alexandra Harris	Romantic Moderns: English Writers, Artists and the Imagination from Virginia Woolf to John Piper	Winner
2010	Ned Beauman	Boxer, Beetle	Finalist
2010	Maile Chapman	Your Presence is Requested at Suvanto	Finalist
2010	Nadifa Mohamed	Black Mamba Boy	Finalist
2010	Kathryn Schulz	In Being Wrong: Adventures in the Margin of Error	Finalist
2011	Siddhartha Mukherjee	The Emperor of All Maladies: A Biography of Cancer	Winner
2011	Stephen Kelman	Pigeon English	Finalist
2011	Juan Pablo Villalobos	Down The Rabbit Hole	Finalist
2011	Mirza Waheed	The Collaborator	Finalist
2011	Amy Waldman	The Submission	Finalist
2012	Kevin Powers	The Yellow Birds	Winner
2012	Katherine Boo	Behind the Beautiful Forevers: Life, Death, and Hope in a Mumbai Undercity	Finalist
2012	Chad Harbach	The Art of Fielding	Finalist
2012	Lindsey Hilsum	Sandstorm: Libya in the Time of Revolution	Finalist
2012	Kerry Hudson	Tony Hogan Bought Me an Ice-cream Float Before He Stole My Ma	Finalist
2013	Donal Ryan	The Spinning Heart	Winner
2013	NoViolet Bulawayo	We Need New Names	Finalist
2013	Shereen El Feki	Sex and the Citadel	Finalist
2013	Hannah Kent	Burial Rites	Finalist
2013	Lottie Moggach	Kiss Me First	Finalist
2014	Colin Barrett	Young Skins	Winner
2014	Henry Marsh	Do No Harm	Finalist
2014	Fiona McFarlane	The Night Guest	Finalist
2014	Evan Osnos	Age of Ambition	Finalist
2014	May-Lan Tan	Things to Make and Break	Finalist
2015	Andrew McMillan	Physical	Winner
2015	Diane Cook	Man v Nature	Finalist
2015	Chigozie Obioma	The Fishermen	Finalist
2015	Peter Pomerantsev	Nothing Is True and Everything Is Possible	Finalist
2015	Max Porter	Grief Is the Thing with Feathers	Finalist
2015	Sara Taylor	The Shore	Finalist

== See also ==
- Guardian Children's Fiction Prize
- Orange Award for New Writers
- The Whitfield Prize
- Guardian Fiction Prize
- Vanguard Personality of the Year Awards
