= New Puritans =

Literary movement

The New Puritans was a literary movement ascribed to the contributors to a 2000 anthology of short stories entitled All Hail the New Puritans, edited by Nicholas Blincoe and Matt Thorne. The project is said to have been inspired by the Dogme 95 manifesto for cinematic minimalism and authenticity. The young writers in the anthology deliberately eschewed many of the devices favoured by the pre-eminent British literary generation exemplified by Julian Barnes, Martin Amis and Salman Rushdie.

== Manifesto ==
The 10-point manifesto reads:

1. Primarily storytellers, we are dedicated to the narrative form.
2. We are prose writers and recognise that prose is the dominant form of expression. For this reason we shun poetry and poetic licence in all its forms.
3. While acknowledging the value of genre fiction, whether classical or modern, we will always move towards new openings, rupturing existing genre expectations.
4. We believe in textual simplicity and vow to avoid all devices of voice: rhetoric, authorial asides.
5. In the name of clarity, we recognise the importance of temporal linearity and eschew flashbacks, dual temporal narratives and foreshadowing.
6. We believe in grammatical purity and avoid any elaborate punctuation.
7. We recognise that published works are also historical documents. As fragments of our time, all our texts are dated and set in the present day. All products, places, artists and objects named are real.
8. As faithful representation of the present, our texts will avoid all improbable or unknowable speculations on the past or the future.
9. We are moralists, so all texts feature a recognisable ethical reality.
10. Nevertheless, our aim is integrity of expression, above and beyond any commitment to form.

The 15 contributors to the anthology included Geoff Dyer, Alex Garland, Daren King, Toby Litt, Tony White, Rebecca Ray, Simon Lewis, Ben Richards and Scarlett Thomas. Reviews for the book were mixed, with some critics confused as to the intentions of the project.

New Puritanism has not been espoused by any well-known writers since the book's publication, and the contributors have not collaborated since, although several of them contributed to the literary magazine Zembla (2003–2005).

== See also ==
- Dogme 95
- Stuckism
- New Sincerity
- Post-postmodernism
- Pseudorealism
- Remodernism
