= Hoxton West (ward) =

London electoral ward

- Electoral ward for the Hackney London Borough Council
- Hoxton West ward boundaries since 2014
- Borough: Hackney
- County: Greater London
- Population: 13,752 (2021)
- Electorate: 9,781 (2022)
- Major settlements: Hoxton
- Area: 0.7257 square kilometres (0.2802 sq mi)

Current electoral ward
- Created: 2014
- Number of members: 3
- Councillors: Ben Lucas; Nicholas Blincoe; Jas Zavar Crowe
- Created from: Hoxton
- GSS code: E05009378

Hoxton West is an electoral ward in the London Borough of Hackney. The ward was first used in the 2014 elections. It returns three councillors to Hackney London Borough Council. The ward was created from most of the previous ward of Hoxton, except for the section east of Pitfield Street.

== List of councillors ==
Term	Councillor	Party
2014–2016	Philip Glanville	Labour
2014–2026	Clayeon McKenzie	Labour
2014–2026	Carole Williams	Labour
2016–2024	Yvonne Maxwell	Labour
2024–present	Ben Lucas	Labour
2026–present	Nicholas Blincoe	Green
2026–present	Jas Zavar Crowe	Green

== Hackney council elections ==
=== 2026 election ===
The election took place on 7 May 2026.

2026 Hackney London Borough Council election
Party	Candidate	Votes	%	±%
Green	Nicholas Blincoe	1,207	38.6	
Labour	Ben Lucas	1,200	38.4	
Green	Jas Zavar Crowe	1,187	38.0	
Labour	Carole Williams*	1,169	37.4	
Green	Dave Carr	1,157	37.0	
Labour	Clayeon McKenzie*	1,082	34.6	
Reform	Paul Kennedy	355	11.4	
Conservative	Mark Beckett	324	10.4	
Conservative	Bella Sharer	252	8.1	
Liberal Democrats	Thierry Levenq	251	8.0	
Conservative	Miroslawa Dabrowska	242	7.7	
Liberal Democrats	Geoffrey Payne	225	7.2	
Majority		7		
Majority		13		
Majority		18		
Turnout			31.8	+5.2
Green gain from Labour		Swing		
Labour hold		Swing		
Green gain from Labour		Swing		

=== 2024 by-election ===
A by-election was held on 27 June 2024, following the resignation of Yvonne Maxwell.

2024 Hoxton West by-election
Party	Candidate	Votes	%	±%
Labour	Ben Lucas	880	64	
Green	Cheuk Ho	238		
Conservative	Farhan Jaisin	154		
Liberal Democrats	Geoffrey Payne	103		
Majority		642		
Turnout		1,375	13.88%	−47.6%
Labour hold		Swing		

=== 2022 election ===
The election took place on 5 May 2022.

2022 Hackney London Borough Council election: Hoxton West (3)
Party	Candidate	Votes	%	±%
Labour	Yvonne Maxwell	1,574		
Labour	Clayeon McKenzie	1,308		
Labour	Carole Williams	1,308		
Conservative	Oliver Hall	452		
Green	Cheuk Ho	449		
Green	Daniel Enzer	447		
Green	Kit McCarthy	423		
Liberal Democrats	Geoffrey Payne	365		
TUSC	Robert Williams	108		
Majority				
Turnout				
Labour hold		Swing		
Labour hold		Swing		
Labour hold		Swing		

=== 2018 election ===
The election took place on 3 May 2018.

2018 Hackney London Borough Council election: Hoxton West (3)
Party	Candidate	Votes	%	±%
Labour	Yvonne Maxwell	1,771		
Labour	Clayeon McKenzie	1,714		
Labour	Carole Williams	1,527		
Green	Fatemeh Beyad	447		
Green	Elisabeth Whitebread	421		
Conservative	Mark Beckett	372		
Green	Chris Venables	366		
Conservative	James Kane	354		
Conservative	Alex Van Terheyden	298		
Majority				
Turnout				
Labour hold		Swing		
Labour hold		Swing		
Labour hold		Swing		

=== 2016 by-election ===
A by-election was held on 3 November 2016, following the election of Philip Glanville as mayor of Hackney.

2016 Hoxton West by-election
Party	Candidate	Votes	%	±%
Labour	Yvonne Maxwell	951		
Conservative	Christopher Sills	185		
Liberal Democrats	Chantel Encavey	133		
Green	Morgan James	123		
Majority				
Turnout				
Labour hold		Swing		

=== 2014 election ===
The election took place on 22 May 2014.

2014 Hackney London Borough Council election: Hoxton West (3)
Party	Candidate	Votes	%	±%
Labour	Philip Glanville	1,693		
Labour	Clayeon McKenzie	1,687		
Labour	Carole Williams	1,634		
Green	Kate Barnett	602		
Green	Matthew Butcher	487		
Green	Jeannine Moros-Noujaim	448		
Conservative	Reinier Johannes Cornelis Bosman	362		
Conservative	John Winston Howard	339		
Conservative	Sean Sullivan	326		
Liberal Democrats	Joseph Horowitz	190		
Liberal Democrats	Ben See	182		
Liberal Democrats	Antonio Silva	161		
TUSC	Jon Hughes	136		
Majority				
Turnout				
Labour win (new seat)				
Labour win (new seat)				
Labour win (new seat)				
