= Mouse Noses on Toast =

2006 children's book by Daren King

- Author: Daren King
- Illustrator: David Roberts
- Language: English
- Genre: Children's
- Publisher: Faber Children's Books
- Publication date: 7 September 2006
- Publication place: United Kingdom
- Pages: 110 pp
- ISBN: 978-0-571-22802-7
- OCLC: 70059830
- LC Class: PZ7.K5764 Mou 2006

Mouse Noses on Toast is a 2006 children's book written by Daren King and illustrated by David Roberts. It won the Nestlé Children's Book Prize Gold Award.

== Plot summary ==
A young mouse called Paul is so shocked to learn that "mouse noses on toast" are served at a fancy restaurant that he gathers a ragtag group of activists to investigate and protest.

== Reception ==
Reviewers variously commented that it is a "quick" and "easy" read, and a "nice book to read aloud". The Observer compared its style of humour to The Magic Roundabout and the School Library Journal said it is "just as engaging as it is loopy". Both the School Library Journal and AuthorLink criticised the ending.

AuthorLink called David Roberts' illustrations "cute", and the School Library Journal said that the "very simple pen-and-ink illustrations ... fit the equally pared down narrative".
