= Hospital (Litt novel) =

2007 novel by Toby Litt

- First edition
- Author: Toby Litt
- Language: English
- Publisher: Hamish Hamilton
- Publication date: 2007
- Publication place: United Kingdom
- Media type: Print
- Pages: 511
- ISBN: 0-241-14280-6
- OCLC: 232364991

Hospital, subtitled A Dream-Vision, is a 2007 novel by Toby Litt, describing surreal events in a large hospital around the framing device of an unnamed boy's attempts to find the exit. It is Litt's eighth novel, and was originally published by Hamish Hamilton.

== Plot ==
Litt initially adopts a realistic tone, portraying several conventional scenarios associated with medical drama, including a nurse's romantic interest in a doctor, the arrival of a coma patient from another hospital, a young boy's stomach-ache (which he believes to be the result of an apple tree growing from a seed he had earlier swallowed), and the medical troubles of other patients. As the novel progresses, situations become increasingly surreal, as the ritual slaughter of a baby by Satanist doctors causes an impenetrable fog of implicitly supernatural origin to beshroud the hospital, impeding contact with the outside world. As the young boy continues to search for an exit, various bizarre events occur: a group of patients begin to worship the comatose man who had been transferred into the hospital earlier that evening; wounds and sicknesses spontaneously heal themselves, to the extent that meat in characters' stomachs regenerates into the animals it had been taken from, ripping their torsos open; and the young boy's fear that an apple tree is growing inside of him is realised.

The book is notable for its large cast of characters, who are progressively introduced throughout in order to convey a sense of confusion and bewilderment. Litt estimates that the novel contains ‘about 130 characters’ overall. The meaning of the narrative is subject to multiple interpretations. Some, such as Martin, have argued that the subtitle implies that the text should be understood as a dream of the coma patient, whereas Steven Poole believes it is an allegorical representation of birth.
