= Journey into Space (book) =

2009 British science fiction novel by Toby Litt

- Cover of Journey into Space
- Author: Toby Litt
- Cover artist: Chris Moore
- Language: English
- Publisher: Penguin Books
- Publication date: 2009
- Media type: Print
- Pages: 243
- ISBN: 978-0-14-103971-8

Journey into Space is a 2009 British science fiction novel by Toby Litt about people living on a generation ship which is bound for another planet. It was Litt's tenth novel and was published by Penguin Books.

== Plot summary ==
The novel is situated on board of the UNSS Armenia, a generation ship which is traveling from the Earth to a far away planet, where humanity is to establish a new civilisation. Because of the vast distance involved, the journey will span the lives of many generations. Apart from the generation which began the journey, and the generation which might end it, most generations will live and die on the ship. But when a child named Orphan is illicitly born from two lovers named August and Celeste, the ship's mission is turned upside down. After a nuclear holocaust wipes out most life on the Earth Orphan eventually takes control of the ship and turns the ship around back to Earth. Many years later a suicidal cult takes over the ship and it plummets back into the Earth, killing everyone on the ship and all remaining life on the planet.

== Reception ==
Journey into Space received a largely positive review by Lorna Bradbury in The Daily Telegraph who referred to it as "an absorbing read, occasionally elevated into something more substantial by moments of inspired writing" She called Litt "perhaps one of our most interesting writers." Ursula Le Guin, who reviewed the novel for The Guardian, was critical of the ending of the book which she described as "sinking into the inane." Bradbury did agree with her that the last third of the novel was the "least satisfying part" but still was positive about the book. Brandon Robshaw, who reviewed Journey into Space for The Independent said that Litt "expertly lays out the relationships, the hierarchies, the changing rules and orthodoxies, in short the entire sociology of this hermetically enclosed community over the duration of the voyage" and that the novel is a "welcome addition to his (Litt's) oeuvre." Simon Akam, in reviewing the novel for the New Statesman, opined that Litt "has a tendency to overindulge his conceptual imagination when a willingness to curb it earlier might have created a tighter result" but also states: "the reason Journey Into Space succeeds is that its author has such a plethora of good ideas to work with that he can get away with overextending a few." Andrew McKie considered Journey into Space one of the better works in a trend of literary writers trying their hands at science fiction: "Toby Litt has managed it too. He has done nothing very new, but he has written a good novel. Journey into Space avoids cliché, the sentences never go clunk, the reader is always engaged — and it offers a thoroughly old-fashioned future."
