= Hoxton (ward) =

- Former electoral ward for the Hackney London Borough Council
- Hoxton ward boundaries
- Borough: Hackney
- County: Greater London
- Population: 15,174 (2011)
- Electorate: 9,999 (2010)
- Area: 0.8396 square kilometres (0.3242 sq mi)

Former electoral ward
- Created: 2002
- Abolished: 2014
- Councillors: 3
- Replaced by: Hoxton East and Shoreditch; Hoxton West
- ONS code: 00AMGK
- GSS code: E05000240

Hoxton was an electoral ward in the London Borough of Hackney from 2002 to 2014. The ward was first used in the 2002 elections and last used at the 2010 elections. It returned three councillors to Hackney London Borough Council.

The ward stretched from Hoxton Street and Hoxton Square in the east to Old Street and City Road in the south and west and Shoreditch Park and the Regents Canal in the north. It formed part of the Hackney South and Shoreditch constituency. The population of the ward at the 2011 Census was 15,174.

== List of councillors ==
Term	Councillor	Party
2002–2006	Simon Pearce	Labour
2002–2014	Carole Williams	Labour
2002–2005	David Manion	Labour
2005–2006	Jonathan McShane	Labour
2006–2014	Clay McKenzie	Labour
2006–2014	Philip Glanville	Labour

== Hackney council elections ==
=== 2010 election ===
The election on 6 May 2010 took place on the same day as the United Kingdom general election.

2010 Hackney London Borough Council election: Hoxton
Party	Candidate	Votes	%	±%
Labour	Philip Glanville	2,464	45.9	
Labour	Clay McKenzie	2,354		
Labour	Carole Williams	2,152		
Liberal Democrats	Salil Bhalla	1,335	24.9	
Liberal Democrats	Koray Dogan	1,320		
Liberal Democrats	James Driver	1,314		
Conservative	Jacqueline Palmer	907	16.9	
Conservative	John Tinley	766		
Conservative	Jessica Wilson	679		
Green	Jenny Lopez Lack	659	12.3	
Turnout		5,150	52	
Labour hold		Swing		
Labour hold		Swing		
Labour hold		Swing		

=== 2006 election ===
The election took place on 4 May 2006.

2006 Hackney London Borough Council election: Hoxton
Party	Candidate	Votes	%	±%
Labour	Clay McKenzie	1,007	38.7	
Labour	Philip Glanville	996		
Labour	Carole Williams	916		
Liberal Democrats	David Phillips	627	24.1	
Liberal Democrats	Carl Nichols	623		
Liberal Democrats	Mahmood Bham	584		
Conservative	Christopher Lennon	540	20.7	
Conservative	Dean Lukeman	470		
Green	Polly Lane	431	16.5	
Conservative	Alexander van Terheyden	429		
Turnout			33.3	
Labour hold		Swing		
Labour hold		Swing		
Labour hold		Swing		

=== 2005 by-election ===
The by-election was held on 5 May 2005, following the resignation of David Manion.

2005 Hoxton by-election
Party	Candidate	Votes	%	±%
Labour	Jonathan McShane	1,443		
Conservative	Alexander Ellis	649		
Liberal Democrats	Sylvia Anderson	586		
Independent	William Butler	310		
Green	Cedric Knight	201		
Respect	Dean Ryan	113		
Majority		794		
Turnout			44.5	
Labour hold		Swing		

=== 2002 election ===
The election took place on 2 May 2002.

2002 Hackney London Borough Council election: Hoxton
Party	Candidate	Votes	%	±%
Labour	Simon Pearce	786		
Labour	Carole Williams	771		
Labour	David Manion	738		
Liberal Democrats	Patricia McGuinness	578		
Liberal Democrats	Kay Stone	492		
Liberal Democrats	Doreen Bullock	474		
Conservative	Paul White	268		
Conservative	Caroline Fazzani	265		
Conservative	Betty Ritchie	265		
CPA	Oluwaseun Bamidele	95		
Turnout				
Labour win (new seat)				
Labour win (new seat)				
Labour win (new seat)				
