= The Idler (1993) =

British magazine

- The Idler #42: Smash the System
- Editor: Tom Hodgkinson
- Categories: Arts/Culture
- Frequency: Bi-monthly
- Founded: 1993
- Company: Idler
- Country: United Kingdom
- Based in: London
- Language: English
- Website: Official website
- ISSN: 1351-5098

The Idler is a bi-monthly magazine, devoted to its ethos of 'idling'. Founded in 1993 by Tom Hodgkinson and Gavin Pretor-Pinney, the publication's intention is to improve public perception of idling.

The magazine combines the aesthetics of 1990s slacker culture and pre–Industrial Revolution idealism. The title comes from a series of essays by Samuel Johnson, published in 1758–59.

== Ethos ==
On the practice of idling, Tom Hodgkinson writes:

A characteristic of the idler's work is that it looks suspiciously like play. This, again, makes the non-idler feel uncomfortable. Victims of the Protestant work ethic would like all work to be unpleasant. They feel that work is a curse, that we must suffer on this earth to earn our place in the next. The idler, on the other hand, sees no reason not to use his brain to organise a life for himself where his play is his work, and so attempt to create his own little paradise in the here and now.

== History ==
In 1991, Tom Hodgkinson came up with the idea for a magazine called The Idler, and recruited his friend and neighbour, author Gavin Pretor-Pinney, to help him develop the concept. In 1993, with then 25-year-old Tom Hodgkinson as its editor, The Idler's first issue was published. The title came from a series of essays by Samuel Johnson. In it, Johnson wrote on such subjects as sleep and sloth and said: "Every man is, or hopes to be, an idler." The new Idler took this 18th-century sensibility and combined it with radical philosophies of the 1990s. Issue One featured a profile of Johnson and an interview with psychonaut Terence McKenna. Stuart Lowry took this magazine in the mid 90s.

The Idler has since enjoyed a number of incarnations. In the 1990s it was published by The Guardian newspaper, then by Ebury publishing. Hodgkinson published the Idler as an annual collection of essays until 2014, then relaunched the magazine in 2016. The magazine is now published quarterly.

== Spin-offs and other media ==
Tom Hodgkinson has written numerous books which develop this attitude to life. The first, How to Be Idle, has been published in 20 countries and has so far become a best-seller in the UK, Italy and Germany. His second book How to Be Free takes an anarchic approach to the everyday barriers that come between us and our dreams. The third is an alternative parenting manual, The Idle Parent, which argues that children should be left largely to their own devices. The fourth, Brave Old World considers the virtues of the self-sufficient, rural lifestyle.

Title	Year	Pages	Author
How to be Idle	2007	286	Tom Hodgkinson
How to be Free	2008	352	Tom Hodgkinson
The Book of Idle Pleasures	2008	224	Tom Hodgkinson and Dan Kieran
The Idle Parent	2009	260	Tom Hodgkinson
Brave Old World	2011	275	Tom Hodgkinson

The Crap series of humour books is a direct spin-off from an Idler column and edited by Dan Kieran:

- Crap Jobs is a series of books chronicling the worst of Idler-readers' forays into employment.
- Crap Towns exposes some of the worst places to live in Great Britain. Crap Towns caught the public imagination but drew fire from both local councils and local media in those areas concerned.
- Crap Holidays is an exploration of Samuel Johnson's maxim that the idler allows events and goods to come to him rather than expend energy and money travelling to disenchanting locations.

The Idler includes archived magazine content and regular updates from the editor.

== Academy ==
The Idler Academy, founded at a festival in 2010, is the Idler's educational offshoot. It is a school which offers online and real-world courses in the classical liberal arts and practical skills. The Idler Academy teaches philosophy, astronomy, calligraphy, music, business skills, English grammar, ukulele, public speaking, singing, drawing, self-defence and other subjects.

=== Bad Grammar Award ===
From 2013 the Academy awarded a Bad Grammar Award. Entries were nominated by Idler readers and Academy students and judged by a panel of experts.

Winners

2018: The NHS

2017: Transport For London

== Notable past contributors ==
Contributors and interviewees who have been featured in the Idler include:

- Dan Kieran, Deputy Editor – author
- Adam Buxton, Comedian and writer
- Jonathan Ross – TV presenter
- Louis Theroux – TV presenter
- Damien Hirst – artist
- Fiona Russell Powell – writer and former ABC band member
- Tony Barrell – Journalist who also writes for The Sunday Times (UK)
- Joanna Blythman – food activist
- Raoul Vaneigem – Situationist theorist
- Chris Donald – Viz comic founder
- Jay Griffiths – author
- Penny Rimbaud – former Crass drummer and spokesperson
- Chris Yates – angler and tea enthusiast
- Pete Doherty – member of The Libertines and Babyshambles
- Bill Oddie – comedian and wildlife expert
- Nicholas Blincoe – British novelist
- Alex James – of Blur
- Patrick Moore – astronomer
- Mark Manning – formerly of Zodiac Mindwarp and the Love Reaction
- Bill Drummond – of The KLF
- Ben Moor – writer and actor
- Tony White – writer and Idler literary editor
- Alain de Botton – philosophy writer
- Adam and Joe – comedy performers
- Matt Bullen – writer and polyamory advocate
- Ian Bone – founder of Class War newspaper

== Current columnists and regulars ==
- Tom Hodgkinson, founder and editor
- Bill Anderson, beekeeping column
- Graham Burnett, gardening column
- Geraldine Coats, gin column
- Will Hodgkinson, music
- Virginia Ironside, agony aunt
- Victoria Hull, food and dining
- Robert Katz, astronomy column
- "Evil Gordon", beer column
- Alex Johnson, snooker column
- Michael Palin, humorous column
- Andrew Smart, science and news
- Gustav Temple, fashion and style
- Robert Wringham, escape column

== See also ==
- Flâneur
- New Escapologist
- Refusal of work
