= Living Next Door to Alice =

1972 single by New World

Single by New World
- B-side: "Something to Say"
- Released: November 1972
- Recorded: 1972
- Genre: Pop; folk
- Label: RAK
- Songwriters: Nicky Chinn; Mike Chapman

New World singles chronology
| "Sister Jane" (1972) | "Living Next Door to Alice" (1972) | "Rooftop Singing" (1973) |

"Living Next Door to Alice" is a song co-written by Nicky Chinn and Mike Chapman. Originally released by Australian pop band New World in 1972, the song charted at No. 35 on the Australian chart. The song later became a worldwide hit for British band Smokie.

== Lyrical content ==
The song is about a man's long-standing unrequited and unadmitted love toward Alice, his next-door neighbour of 24 years. The protagonist learned through mutual friend Sally that Alice is moving away, and begins to reflect on childhood memories and his friendship with Alice, and becomes heartbroken as he sees Alice drive away in a limousine. In the final verse, Sally reveals that all the time she has been waiting 24 years for her opportunity with him ("Alice is gone, but I'm still here").

Later versions of the song insert an interjection during a pause in the chorus (from the audience during live performances or from a guest separate from the lead singer): "Alice! Who the fuck is Alice?" (guests will sometimes say "hell" or "heck"). These performances may also change a line in the chorus so that the singer's affections are as much sexual as they are romantic, and that the singer had hoped to "get inside her pants" instead of "get a second glance."

On the American Top 40 broadcast of 26 May 1979, Casey Kasem reported that Chapman stated that his source of inspiration for "Living Next Door to Alice" was "Sylvia's Mother" by Dr. Hook.

== Smokie versions ==
"Living Next Door to Alice"

Single by Smokie
- B-side: "Run to You" (UK); When My Back was Against the Wall (US & Canada)
- Released: 12 November 1976
- Recorded: 1976
- Genre: Soft rock; pop rock
- Length: 3:27
- Label: RAK (UK); RSO (US & Canada)
- Songwriters: Nicky Chinn; Mike Chapman
- Producers: Nicky Chinn; Mike Chapman

Smokie singles chronology
| "I'll Meet You at Midnight" (1976) | "Living Next Door to Alice" (1976) | "Lay Back in the Arms of Someone" (1977) |

Music video
- "Living Next Door to Alice" on YouTube

In November 1976, the British band Smokie released their version of "Living Next Door to Alice". The single peaked at number five on the UK Singles Chart and, in March 1977, reached 25 in the United States. It was a number one hit in Austria, Germany, Ireland, The Netherlands, Norway and Switzerland and a number 2 hit in Australia staying in the charts for 23 weeks.

=== Charts ===
==== Weekly charts ====
| Chart (1976–1977) | Peak position |
|---|---|
| Australia (Kent Music Report) | 2 |
| Austria (Ö3 Austria Top 40) | 1 |
| Belgium (Ultratop 50 Flanders) | 1 |
| Belgium (Ultratop 50 Wallonia) | 11 |
| Canada Top Singles (RPM) | 17 |
| Ireland (IRMA) | 1 |
| Netherlands (Dutch Top 40) | 1 |
| Netherlands (Single Top 100) | 1 |
| New Zealand (Recorded Music NZ) | 7 |
| Norway (VG-lista) | 1 |
| Sweden (Sverigetopplistan) | 3 |
| Switzerland (Schweizer Hitparade) | 1 |
| UK Singles (Official Charts) | 5 |
| US Billboard Hot 100 | 25 |
| US Adult Contemporary (Billboard) | 24 |
| West Germany (GfK) | 1 |

==== Year-end charts ====
| Chart (1977) | Position |
|---|---|
| Australia (Kent Music Report) | 5 |
| Austria (Ö3 Austria Top 40) | 1 |
| Belgium (Ultratop Flanders) | 12 |
| Netherlands (Dutch Top 40) | 9 |
| Netherlands (Single Top 100) | 11 |
| Switzerland (Schweizer Hitparade) | 1 |
| West Germany (Official German Charts) | 4 |

=== Certifications ===
| Region | Certification | Certified units/sales |
|---|---|---|
| Denmark (IFPI Danmark) | Gold | 45,000^{‡} |
| Germany (BVMI) | Gold | 700,000 |
| New Zealand (RMNZ) | Platinum | 30,000^{‡} |
^{‡} Sales+streaming figures based on certification alone.

== Johnny Carver version ==
"Living Next Door to Alice"

Single by Johnny Carver

from the album The Best of Johnny Carver
- Released: February 1977
- Recorded: 1976
- Genre: Country
- Label: ABC
- Songwriters: Nicky Chinn; Mike Chapman
- Producer: Ron Chancey

Johnny Carver singles chronology
| "Afternoon Delight" (1976) | "Living Next Door to Alice" (1977) | "Down at the Pool" (1977) |

Concurrent with Smokie's American success with the song, country music singer Johnny Carver released his own version of "Living Next Door to Alice" in 1977. Carver's version peaked at No. 29 on the Billboard Hot Country Singles chart in April 1977.

== Gompie version ==
"Alice, Who the X is Alice?"

Single by Gompie

from the album Who the X Is Gompie!
- B-side: "My Brother Is a Rocker"; "Slaves on the Run"
- Released: February 1995
- Length: 3:58
- Label: RPC Entertainment
- Songwriters: Nicky Chinn; Mike Chapman
- Producers: Rob Peters; Ono Pelser; John van de Ven

Gompie singles chronology
| "Alice, Who the X is Alice?" (1995) | "Tarzan & Heidi" (1995) |

A more risqué version of "Living Next Door to Alice" was released by the Dutch novelty act Gompie in 1995, titled "Alice, Who the X Is Alice?". Their version topped the charts in Flanders and the Netherlands, and reached the top 10 in Austria, Germany, Norway, and Switzerland. In the United Kingdom, the song peaked at number 17.

Gompie is a project of Peter Koelewijn and Rob Peters. Peters, while visiting a bar called Gompie in Nijmegen, heard "Living Next Door to Alice" by Smokie. After the name Alice in the song, the disc jockey Onno Pelser turned down the volume and the crowd sang "Alice, who the fuck is Alice?". Peters realized it could become a hit record, contacted Koelewijn and a day later the song was recorded and released under the name Gompie.

The success of this version resulted in various similar versions, including a new recording by Smokie with blue comedian Roy 'Chubby' Brown. During his tours and associated videos in the early-2000s, Chubby Brown claimed he played drums on the recording, then a few years later claimed he originally wrote the song as well.

A dance version of the cover was released by the Steppers, titled "Alice, Who the F..k Is Alice?", and reached No. 2 on the Australian Singles Chart in September 1995. Actor Alan Fletcher, who plays doctor Karl Kennedy in the soap opera Neighbours, took up the song as "Who the Fuck Is Susan?" at fan events, in reference to his erstwhile fictional wife.

=== Critical reception ===
Alan Jones from Music Week wrote, "In the finest tradition of Dutch compatriots Stars On 45, Gompie perform a very accurate imitation of Smokie's 1976 Top Five hit, 'Living Next Door To Alice'. Their template only slips after they sing the title refrain, whereupon an ensemble pipes up, Alice, Who The Fuck Is Alice?, at least on the unedited version. It's a one-joke song, and the irony is that it may succeed as much on the strength of the original song as the imitation. However, competing versions by Smokie themselves (with Roy Chubby Brown) and Paddy Goes To Holyhead will be in there fighting too."

=== Charts ===
==== Weekly charts ====
| Chart (1995) | Peak position |
|---|---|
| Australia (ARIA) | 54 |
| Austria (Ö3 Austria Top 40) | 2 |
| Belgium (Ultratop 50 Flanders) | 1 |
| Belgium (Ultratop 50 Wallonia) | 36 |
| Europe (Eurochart Hot 100) | 11 |
| Germany (GfK) | 2 |
| Iceland (Íslenski Listinn Topp 40) | 3 |
| Israel (Israeli Singles Chart) | 8 |
| Netherlands (Dutch Top 40) | 1 |
| Netherlands (Single Top 100) | 1 |
| New Zealand (Recorded Music NZ) | 29 |
| Norway (VG-lista) | 4 |
| Scottish Singles Sales (Official Charts) | 13 |
| Switzerland (Schweizer Hitparade) | 2 |
| UK Singles (Official Charts) | 17 |

==== Year-end charts ====
| Chart (1995) | Position |
|---|---|
| Austria (Ö3 Austria Top 40) | 30 |
| Belgium (Ultratop 50 Flanders) | 10 |
| Europe (Eurochart Hot 100) | 32 |
| Germany (Media Control) | 10 |
| Israel (Israeli Singles Chart) | 19 |
| Netherlands (Dutch Top 40) | 24 |
| Netherlands (Single Top 100) | 8 |
| Switzerland (Schweizer Hitparade) | 6 |
| UK Singles (OCC) | 97 |

=== Certifications ===
| Region | Certification | Certified units/sales |
|---|---|---|
| Belgium (BRMA) | Gold | 25,000^{*} |
| Germany (BVMI) | Gold | 250,000^{^} |
| Netherlands (NVPI) | Gold | 50,000^{^} |
| Norway (IFPI Norway) | Gold | |
| Switzerland (IFPI Switzerland) | Gold | 25,000^{^} |
^{*} Sales figures based on certification alone.^{^} Shipments figures based on certification alone.

== Smokie featuring Roy Chubby Brown version ==
"Living Next Door to Alice (Who the F**k is Alice?)"

Single by Smokie featuring Roy Chubby Brown
- B-side: "Living Next Door to Alice" (Unbleeped)
- Released: 1995
- Genre: Pop rock; parody
- Songwriters: Nicky Chinn; Mike Chapman

Smokie singles chronology
| "Boulevard of Broken Dreams" (1989) | "Living Next Door to Alice (Who the F**k is Alice?)" (1995) |

Roy Chubby Brown singles chronology
| "Living Next Door to Alice (Who the F**k is Alice?)" (1995) | "A Rocking Good Christmas" (1996) |

Smokie collaborated on a novelty re-recording in 1995 with comedian Roy Chubby Brown, with the song interspersed with Roy Chubby Brown saying "Who the fuck is Alice?". In March 1995, Smokie's singer Alan Barton died following an accident in Germany, and the version with Brown was released with all proceeds going to the family of Barton. The song peaked at number three on the UK Singles Chart in October 1995, selling almost half a million copies.

=== Charts ===
Weekly charts

| Chart (1995) | Peak position |
|---|---|
| Europe (Eurochart Hot 100) | 14 |
| Germany (GfK) | 18 |
| Ireland (IRMA) | 26 |
| Scottish Singles Sales (Official Charts) | 2 |
| Sweden (Sverigetopplistan) | 22 |
| UK Singles (Official Charts) | 3 |

Year-end charts

| Chart (1995) | Position |
|---|---|
| Europe (Eurochart Hot 100) | 78 |
| Germany (Media Control) | 69 |
| UK Singles (OCC) | 18 |

=== Certifications ===
| Region | Certification | Certified units/sales |
|---|---|---|
| United Kingdom (BPI) | Platinum | 600,000^{‡} |
^{‡} Sales+streaming figures based on certification alone.

== Other cover versions ==
In 1973, the American band Gallery recorded the song and included it on the second album, Gallery featuring Jim Gold. It was released as a single in 1974 but failed to chart.

In 1982, British punk band Chron Gen included a live, sexually explicit version of "Living Next Door to Alice" on the cassette "Apocalypse Live Tour June '81 (Live at Leicester)" and released a studio version of the song on the debut album "Chronic Generation".

In 1985, Australian comedian Kevin Bloody Wilson released "Living Next Door to Alan", a parody of "Living Next Door to Alice" imagining an Aboriginal family living next door to Alan Bond, a famous Australian entrepreneur.

In 1996, Jimmy Sturr recorded the song under the title "Alice" on his album Polka! All Night Long.

The 1996 album The Smurfs Go Pop! by The Smurfs included a song to the same tune, titled "Smurfland".

Ex-Smokie vocalist Chris Norman included his solo cover of the song on his 2000 studio album Full Circle.

=== Translations ===
Danish singer Flemming "Bamse" Jørgensen covered the song as "Alice" on his 1977 solo debut Din Sang.

In 1981, South Korean band Oxen 80 (옥슨80) recorded cover of the song with title "In a Lonely Night" (그대 떠난 이 밤에).

In Finnish, the song was recorded in 1977 by Kari Tapio, with the title "Viisitoista kesää" ("Fifteen Summers"). The arrangement is by Veikko Samuli and the Finnish lyrics by Juha Vainio.

In Norwegian, there is a translation, "I 24 år har jeg bodd i samme gård som Anne". There are also other songs to the same tune. "Storholt, Stensen, Stenshjemmet, Sjøbrend åsså'n Hjallis" deals with the famous Norwegian speed skating team known as The Four Aces. The single was released in 1977 by Stein Ingebrigtsen & Store Stå and peaked at No. 3 on the Norwegian VG-lista.

A German version of the song, titled "Tür an Tür mit Alice", was a hit for Howard Carpendale in 1977. The single peaked at No. 8 in Germany and Switzerland and at No. 11 in Austria.

In Czechoslovakia, the song was released on 21 February 1973 under the title "Alenka v říši divů" ("Alice in Wonderland"), performed by Karel Zich. There is also a parody version recorded under the name Denis, from the Czech Republic.

A Hungarian version was performed by István Torontáli with the title "Drága Alice" ("Dear Alice"), including lyrics translated by Tibor Bornai.

In former Yugoslavia, Toni Montano made a song based on the original tune, titled "10 godina" ("10 Years").

A Russian version of the song, titled "Элис" ("Alice") was released by Конец фильма (Movie End) rock band in 2001 as the closing song of their studio album Soundtracks (Goodbye, Innocence). Its lyrics are by Mikhail Bashakov. The humorous lyrics are driven by the "А кто такая Элис?" ("But who is actually Alice?") interjection (thus, no profanity in the Russian version) and are about some company considering crashing at Alice's place, indeed answering to the ever repeated question in form of a long list of her virtues ("she is well dressed, she speaks beautifully, she is fluent in English and Hebrew" etc.). There is also an animated cartoon by Dmitry Rezchikov based on this version.

== Bibliography ==
- Whitburn, Joel (2006). Top Country Songs: 1944–2005.
- Whitburn, Joel (2007). Top Pop Songs: 1955–2006.
