= People & Power =

- Genre: News (formerly); Current affairs programme
- Created by: Al Jazeera English
- Original language: English

Production
- Production locations: Doha; Kuala Lumpur; London; Washington DC
- Editor: Diarmuid Jeffreys

Original release
- Network: Al Jazeera English; Al Jazeera America (2013-2016)
- Release: 15 November 2006 – 16 April 2020

People & Power is a current affairs programme on Al Jazeera English which broadcasts once a week, on Wednesdays, and repeated throughout the week. The show is also shown on Al Jazeera America once a week on Thursdays.

Each half-hour programme features one investigative documentary on an issue related to power from around the world. The programme occasionally has one-hour specials.

== History ==
People & Power was launched on November 15, 2006 when Al Jazeera English launched.

The programme originally had a presenter. It was hosted by Shereen El Feki but she was replaced by a new presenter, Samah El-Shahat, a development economist, in March 2007. Juliana Ruhfus was the programme’s main reporter and occasional presenter. Her film on the ex-combatants in Liberia launched the programme the day Al Jazeera went on air.

The show introduced several regular slots. A series called ‘If I had the Power’ asked people in the street what they would do if they had the power of President of the United States George W. Bush for the day. Five minute long ‘Power of One’ films look at how one person has changed the lives of a community through their own actions. These slots are no longer shown.

People & Power has since had a major relaunch.

== Interviews ==
Occasionally the programme features studio discussions.

On the day of Tony Blair’s departure, Samah El-Shahat led a discussion on the departing Prime Minister’s legacy. Her guests were the Iraqi journalist Ziad Al-Khuzai, Ruth Lea - the Director of the Centre for Policy Studies and Lord Ahmed from the British House of Lords.

In a People & Power special on 3 June 2007, Samah El-Shahat led a discussion on the ‘Fragmentation of the Middle East’ from the Doha studios. It featured Dr. Azzam Tamimi, the Director of the Institute for Islamic Political Thought, Dr. Amr Hamzawy, a Senior Researcher at the Carnegie Endowment, Dr. Ibrahim Mousawi, the Editor-in-Chief of foreign news at Al Manar TV, and Dr. Ahmed Abdel Malik, a Qatari Journalist.
