= U.F.O. (1993 film) =

1993 film by Tony Dow

- Directed by: Tony Dow
- Written by: Roy Chubby Brown; Simon Wright; Richard Hall
- Produced by: Simon Wright
- Starring: Roy Chubby Brown; Sara Stockbridge; Roger Lloyd-Pack
- Cinematography: Paul Wheeler
- Edited by: Geoff Hogg
- Music by: Roy Chubby Brown
- Production company: Polygram Filmed Entertainment
- Distributed by: Feature Film Company
- Release date: 10 December 1993 (United Kingdom)
- Running time: 79 minutes
- Country: United Kingdom
- Language: English
- Budget: £1.4 million
- Box office: £0.3 million

U.F.O. (also known as U.F.O. - The Movie) is a 1993 British science fiction spoof directed by Tony Dow and starring Roy Chubby Brown in the role of a blue comedian whose act offends a pair of female aliens, who proceed to kidnap him and put him on trial.

== Plot ==
Performing one night at the end of Blackpool Pier, stand-up comedian Chubby is beamed up to a spaceship populated by feminist aliens. Put on trial for crimes against women and quickly found guilty, the unapologetic misogynist is condemned to become pregnant every year for the next thirty years.

== Cast ==
- Roy Chubby Brown — himself
- Sara Stockbridge — Zoe
- Roger Lloyd-Pack — Solo
- Amanda Symonds — Ava
- Shirley Anne Field — Judge
- Kenny Baker — Casanova
- Kiran Shah — Genghis Khan
- Rusty Goffe — King Henry VIII
- Sue Lloyd — Judge
- Antony Georghiou — Count Dracula
- Ben Aris — Doctor Richard Head
- Paul Barber — The Doctor (voice)

== Production ==
The film was shot at Pinewood Studios.

== Reception ==
It was reviewed poorly, with Empire calling the film "a stand-up show, allowing the comedian to tell his sexist jokes to a race of aliens who charge him for being a misogynist" and rating it 1/5. Geoffrey Mcnab from Sight and Sound said it was "wildly uneven, often offensive, but with a cheerful inanity which goes some way to compensate for its grosser shortcomings".

The film opened on 45 screens on 10 December 1993 in the United Kingdom and grossed £73,925 for the weekend, placing ninth. It went on to gross £323,000. It was expected to recover its budget of £1.4 million through video rentals and sales.

The film was initially banned in cinemas and on video in Ireland.
