= Shereen El Feki =

British journalist and author

- Born: 1967 or 1968 (age 58–59)
- Education: University of Toronto BSc (1991); University of Cambridge MPhil and DPhil; McMaster University MD (2026 - 2029)
- Occupations: journalist, author, medical student

Shereen El Feki (Arabic: شيرين الفقي; born 1968) is a British journalist, author and medical student, most notable for her book Sex and the Citadel: Intimate Life in a Changing Arab World.

== Early life and education ==
El Feki was born in Great Britain to a Welsh mother and an Egyptian Muslim father. Her mother converted to Islam. Shereen grew up in Canada, visiting her grandmother in Cairo on a regular basis. She graduated from the University of Toronto with a BSc in immunology in 1991, then obtaining an MPhil and PhD in immunology from the University of Cambridge. She is currently obtaining an MD at McMaster University in Hamilton, Ontario, graduating in 2029.

== Career ==
El Feki joined The Economist as a healthcare correspondent in 1998. After the 2001 WTC terror attacks, she learned Arabic and started to research the Middle East, in particular, the issues of emancipation and women's sexuality, spending much of her time in Egypt. In 2005, she left The Economist, and from 2006 to 2008, she hosted weekly shows, People & Power and The Pulse, on Al Jazeera International. From 2010 to 2012, she was vice-chairwoman of the United Nations' Global Commission on H.I.V. and the Law.

In 2013, El Feki published Sex and the Citadel: Intimate Life in a Changing Arab World, which has been translated into Dutch, Bahasa Indonesia, French and German, with Spanish and Arabic translations forthcoming. "Sex and the Citadel" has been nominated for the Guardian First Book Award and The Orwell Prize; El Feki's TED talk on sexuality in the Arab region has received almost 1 million views since 2014. The book surveys sexual attitudes in Egypt and the wider Arab world, and presents results of her five years of research. She concluded that taboos around sexuality are starting to be challenged in the Arab societies, and that such debates in personal life are key to change in the politics, economics and the broader public sphere. However, she warns that such change comes "by evolution, not revolution" over a generation at least. Since 2022, she has been a member of the Commission for Universal Health convened by Chatham House and co-chaired by Helen Clark and Jakaya Kikwete.

== Sources ==
- El Feki, Shereen (2013). Sex and the Citadel: Intimate Life in a Changing Arab World. Pantheon Books.
