= Tony Barrell (journalist) =

British journalist

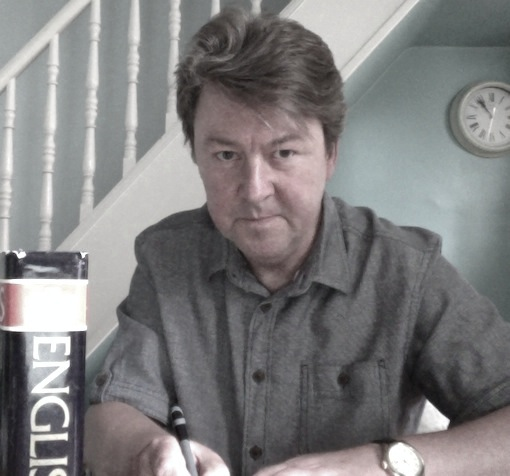
- Tony Barrell in July 2015
- Born: Crawley, West Sussex, England
- Occupation: Journalist
- Years active: 1993–present

Tony Barrell is a British journalist, known for his humour and his exploration of the unusual and the unexplained. He is the author of the 2017 book The Beatles on the Roof. Barrell has also written many major features for the Sunday Times, and has contributed to The Times, The Idler, and Cornucopia magazine, among other publications. He has frequently written about celebrities, as well as people with fringe interests and beliefs such as cult members, alien abductees and battle re-enactors. He was born in Crawley in West Sussex.

Barrell has interviewed actors such as Gillian Anderson and Johnny Depp, comedians such as Vic Reeves, Paul Whitehouse, Matt Lucas and David Walliams, artists such as Sir Peter Blake, Marc Quinn, Keith Tyson and Rolf Harris, and musicians and bands such as Jimmy Page, Dido, Joan Baez, Ronnie Wood, Andy Summers, Donovan, Celine Dion, Mike Oldfield, Sandie Shaw, Garbage, Dixie Chicks, the Finn Brothers, The Beautiful South, Alisha's Attic, Phil Manzanera, and Goldfrapp.

Barrell has also written major features on subjects such as the Roswell UFO incident, the twins festival of Twinsburg, Ohio, the re-enactment of the Battle of Hastings, the celebrity lookalike industry, live-action roleplaying, the science of kissing, The Beatles, David Bowie, Monty Python's Flying Circus, Lucian Freud, Charles Saatchi, Harry Houdini, and Screaming Lord Sutch. Barrell has said that he discovered the "underexplored sexual side of Rolf Harris" when he interviewed the entertainer in 2001.

In a Sunday Times Magazine feature in 2002, Barrell said he thought a personal UFO experience in 1976 may have led to his penchant for writing about bizarre subjects and unexplained events. It is possible that the experience, he wrote, "intensified my ability to empathise with people whom many others would dismiss as crackpots. I've been there, bought the T-shirt: I know what it's like to confess to unusual beliefs and to suffer mockery for them”.

For most of 2009, Barrell researched and wrote the Did You Know? page for the Sunday Times Magazine, which included investigations into urban myths, unsung heroes, and fictional characters based on real people. From June 2005 to January 2006, Barrell wrote the Sunday Times Magazine column "Born on the Same Day", which compared and contrasted the lives of famous people with exactly the same birth date – such as Margaret Thatcher and Lenny Bruce, Sylvester Stallone and George W. Bush, Marc Bolan and Rula Lenska, and Michael Jackson and Lenny Henry. Barrell wrote the 2015 book Born To Drum: The Truth About The World's Greatest Drummers, and the 2020 book Beatlemania: Four Photographers on the Fab Four, 1963-1965. He edited the 2012 book The Miracle: One Musician’s Amazing Struggle For Survival by Shelly Poole, which documents the recovery of Poole's husband, the Texas guitarist Ally McErlaine, from a potentially fatal brain aneurysm. Barrell has also written extensively about photography, and provided the main text for the 2004 book Eyes Wide Open, about the annual Ian Parry photographic award.
