= Finding Myself =

2003 novel by Toby Litt

Finding myself
- First edition
- Author: Toby Litt
- Language: English
- Genre: postmodern
- Publisher: Hamish Hamilton
- Publication date: 2003
- Publication place: United Kingdom
- Media type: Print (Hardback & Paperback)
- ISBN: 0-241-14155-9
- OCLC: 51913252
- Dewey Decimal: 823/.914 22
- LC Class: PR6062.I827 F56 2003

Finding Myself is a 2003 novel by Toby Litt. The story is a comedy about friendship, love, hate and society in the English seaside town of Southwold, and centers on the main characters, female writer Victoria About ("pronounced Abut") and the friends and relatives she has invited for a month.

Finding Myself is the sixth novel by Toby Litt, and published by Penguin Books. The Times called it "a compelling page-turner", The Observer thought it was "fascinating and dazzling".

== Plot summary ==
The plot centers on Victoria About, a prolific female English writer, who has invited some of her friends and relatives to come and stay at a seaside house she has rented in Southwold. The only condition is the fact that they all have to allow her to watch them and to turn all she sees and hears into her next novel, "From The Lighthouse". Clearly inspired by Virginia Woolf, Victoria drafts a synopsis with things (such as rows & relationships) that will happen during the month. But as the summer holiday starts, Victoria is not pleased with the general boredom and carefree conversations that happen in the house.

Little does she know that when the guests discover she has hidden spycams all over the house, and when she gets trapped in the attic by all her friends and relatives, her life and her book start to take a twist.

== Style and content ==
Finding Myself is most remarkable for the way it has been printed. What you read is in fact "the day-to-day account of the preparing of this book and all the other material on the file from her [Victoria's] laptop. In preparing this book, we have made one or two very slight cuts to the text - mainly for a desire to avoid unnecessary repetition. Apart from that, what you have just read (and, I hope, enjoyed reading) is exactly what Victoria herself wrote." (Finding Myself, page 386)

Indeed, you get, in the handwriting of Victoria's editor Simona, cuts, remarks, advice and replacements in the margins of the book. Simona, who was also invited by Victoria to stay for the summer, is worried about certain assumptions that Victoria makes, but also often cuts the descriptions of herself as "boring" and violent towards her husband.

The figure of the real author, Toby Litt, disappears completely in the background. While it is not unusual for a female writer to have a male main character in the I-narrator, it is the other way around. Litt manages to have a very convincing female I-narrator, and by making use of the "day-to-day" narration, the book sounds very real. At the same time the book also criticizes the concept of a narrator, and the way he/she can influence the truth or what really happened. Simona makes cuts and replaces things that Victoria wrote. Did Victoria write the truth, and is Simona bending it? Or is she merely adjusting the things that Victoria wrote down erroneously? And what role does the "real writer", Litt, play in this? In these regards the book can easily be seen as a postmodern novel.

== Reviews ==
- Literary Review: "Entertaining, inventive and original"
- Scotland on Sunday: "Exciting, a huge amount of fun, some of Litt's best writing"
- The Herald: "Original, engaging and sparkling... a delicious comedy"

== Trivia ==
- According to Victoria, the title should have been "From The Lighthouse" (inspired by Virginia Woolf's To the Lighthouse), but as they never managed to actually visit it, she turns it into "Finding Myself" at the last moment.
- Finding Myself is the sixth book by Toby Litt, and therefore the title starts with an F, the sixth letter of the alphabet.
