= Ian Vince =

Ian Vince (born 16 December 1964) is an author, designer, and scriptwriter, as well as a regular contributor to The Guardian, a columnist for BBC Countryfile Magazine and a former columnist for the Daily Telegraph.

He is the author of Britain: What A State, based on his website that purports to be the work of a (fictitious) UK government department, the Department of Social Scrutiny, and the Little Black Book of Red Tape. He is the co-author of The Myway Code and Three Men In A Float, both with Dan Kieran.

He co-presented (with Dan Kieran and Prasanth Visweswaran) a half-hour programme on BBC Radio 4 called Three Men In A Float, which aired on 27 February 2008.

His writing credits include The Daily Telegraph, The Guardian, Countryfile Magazine, the Radio Times, BBC Radio 4, BBC World Service, Channel 4's Bremner Bird and Fortune, produced by Vera Productions and BBC3's Rush Hour Sketch Show, produced by Zeppotron

== Bibliography ==
- Britain: What A State, 2005 Boxtree Ltd, ISBN 0-7522-2598-7
- The Myway Code, (with Dan Kieran), 2006 Boxtree Ltd, ISBN 0-7522-2620-7
- The Little Black Book of Red Tape, 2007 Orion, ISBN 0-7528-8999-0
- Three Men in a Float (with Dan Kieran), 2008 John Murray Ltd, ISBN 0-7195-9501-0
- The Lie of the Land, 2010 Boxtree Ltd, ISBN 0-7522-2711-4
