= Nova Zembla =

Nova Zembla may refer to:

- Nova Zembla Island, Nunavut, Canada
- Novaya Zemlya, labeled as Nova Zembla on some old European maps, a Russian archipelago in the Arctic Ocean
- Nova Zembla (film), a 2011 Dutch film
- Nova Zembla (record label), a Belgian electronic music label

== See also ==
- Zembla (disambiguation)
