= Do No Harm (book) =

2014 memoir written by Henry Marsh

Do No Harm: Stories of Life, Death, and Brain Surgery
- First edition
- Author: Henry Marsh
- Genre: Biography / Science / Medicine
- Publisher: Weidenfeld & Nicolson
- Publication date: 9 October 2014
- Publication place: United Kingdom
- Media type: Print (hardcover)
- Pages: 291
- ISBN: 978-1-250-09013-3

Do No Harm: Stories of Life, Death, and Brain Surgery is a 2014 memoir written by Henry Marsh and published by Weidenfeld & Nicolson. The book details the author's career as a neurosurgeon.

== Synopsis ==
Marsh's father was a human rights lawyer and his mother a refugee from Nazi Germany. Marsh finished a bachelor's degree. When his studies finished he spent two years working in the National Archive. He spent a year in Africa teaching as a volunteer, and then studied Politics, Economics, and Philosophy at the University of Oxford. After a life crisis, he became a stretcher-bearer in a hospital and discovered an interest in medicine, finding "... its controlled and altruistic violence deeply appealing. It seemed to involve excitement and job security, a combination of manual and mental skills, and power and social status as well." He decided to study medicine, but because he lacked O-levels or A-levels in science, he was rejected by London Medical Schools. Instead he enrolled in the Royal Free Medical School. After medical school, he joined a surgical firm in his teaching hospital.

He discusses ethical dilemmas: for example, when a 96-year-old woman needs surgery, but would prefer to die at home instead. Marsh's three-month-old son William was admitted to the local hospital, where he had a tumour removed five days later, which was diagnosed as a choroid plexus papilloma. Marsh experienced the anguish that parents endure when their children are patients: "Anxious and angry relatives are a burden all doctors must bear, but having been one myself was an important part of my medical education. Doctors, I tell my trainees with a laugh, can't suffer enough."

== Critical reception ==
Critical reception was positive. Karl Ove Knausgård praised the book, stating that the work has "true honesty in an unexpected place". The work has also received praise from The Observer and The Daily Telegraph; in the latter, Nicholas Blincoe called it "an elegant series of meditations at the closing of a long career". Michiko Kakutani was also favorable, writing that while the book "may unsettle readers" it would "at the same time leave them with a searing appreciation of the wonders of the human body, and gratitude that there are surgeons like Henry Marsh using their hard-won expertise to save and repair lives."

=== Awards ===
- 2015 Winner of the PEN Ackerley Prize
- Finalist for the Pol Roger Duff Cooper Prize
- 2015 Finalist for the Wellcome Book Prize
- Financial Times Best Business Book of the Year
- Economist Best Book of the Year
- 2015 Washington Post Notable Book of the Year
- New York Times Notable Book of the Year
