= Richard Milward =

English novelist

- Born: 26 October 1984 (age 41); Middlesbrough, England
- Occupation: Writer
- Writing career
- Genres: Novel, play, short story
- Notable work: Apples
- Literary movement: Modernism, post-modernism
- Website: www.richardmilward.com

Richard Milward (born 26 October 1984 in Middlesbrough) is an English novelist. His debut novel Apples was published by Faber in 2007. He has also written Ten Storey Love Song, Kimberly's Capital Punishment, and Man-Eating Typewriter.

== Early life ==
Raised in Guisborough, (Redcar and Cleveland), Milward attended Laurence Jackson School and Prior Pursglove College. He then studied fine art at Byam Shaw School of Art at Central Saint Martins College of Art and Design in London.

== Career ==
Milward cites Trainspotting by Irvine Welsh as the book that made him want to write and Jack Kerouac, Richard Brautigan and Hunter S. Thompson as influences. He joined fellow Teessider Michael Smith in writing a column for Dazed & Confused magazine.

=== Apples ===
Milward's debut novel is an account of teenage life on a Middlesbrough housing estate. It is narrated in the first person by several characters (including a butterfly), but mainly by Adam and Eve, two school students. Adam is a shy, ungainly youth with obsessive-compulsive disorder, a love of The Beatles, and a violent father. He believes himself to be in love with Eve, who is an attractive and promiscuous hard drinker and drug user.

=== Man-Eating Typewriter ===
Milward's 2023 novel Man-Eating Typewriter is notable for its extensive use of Polari, a form of slang commonly used by the gay community in England until the late 1960s. Milward's novel is about a struggling publishing house, Glass Eye Press, that has been contacted by the mysterious Raymond M. Novak. Novak announces that he will commit a major crime within the year, and will allow Glass Eye Press to publish his memoirs after the crime has been committed. Novak's memoirs are written entirely in Polari. Throughout the memoir, there are footnotes from the employees of Glass Eye Press. These are initially used to guide the reader through Novak's eccentric use of Polari but grow into a narrative told alongside Novak's memoirs.

The novel earned positive reviews. Boyd Tonkin of Financial Times called the novel "a mind-bending performance that unspools in flavoursome Polari" In The Guardian, Neil Bartlett wrote that Milward "produced that rarest of all things on the modern fiction bookshelf: a genuinely exhilarating entertainment. The linguistic invention borders on the dazzling, the potted social history drops its names with wit and verve, and the whole thing is both laugh-out-loud funny and authentically disgusting."

It was one of six novels shortlisted for the 2023 Goldsmiths Prize.

== Bibliography ==
=== Novels ===
- Apples (2007)
- Ten Storey Love Song (2009)
- Kimberly's Capital Punishment (2012)
- Man-Eating Typewriter (2023)
