= Beatniks (novel) =

1997 novel by Toby Litt

- First edition (publ. Secker & Warburg); Vauxhall Chevette pictured
- Author: Toby Litt
- Publisher: Random House UK
- Publication date: September 2, 1997
- ISBN: 978-0-436-20371-8

Beatniks: An English Road Movie (1997) is a novel by British author Toby Litt. Set in Bedford in 1995, the novel concerns the adventures of a group of young people who admire the Beat Writers and Musicians of the 1950s and 1960s America. They attempt to live in the lifestyle of the Beatniks and at least one of them dresses in a retro style. Despite their shared interests, there are feelings of hostility and intimidation within the group. The novel was initially published by Secker & Warburg in 1997.

== Plot summary ==
Mary (a recent graduate from University) meets Jack, Maggie and Neal at a party and learns that despite it being The UK of 1995, they yearn for the life of a Beatnik in 1960s America. Fascinated by the group (especially the handsome, if difficult Jack) she embarks on an adventure with them, finding both love and tragedy on the way.

== Characters ==
- Mary, a young headstrong woman, who has recently graduated from University and lives with her parents (the novel is told in first person, from her view point).
- Jack, an intense and handsome young man in his early twenties who idolises Jack Kerouac and Bob Dylan, so much so he refuses to entertain anything that existed after 1966. He is the most enigmatic of the characters, as despite being the lead male of the novel, we never learn where or who he lives with, or his real name (Jack is a pseudonym borrowed from his idol).
- Neal/Matthew, a gentle affectionate young man, who shares Jack's passion for The Beats. Like Jack he goes by a pseudonym (in his case Neal Cassady) he loves, but is intimidated by Jack. More is known about him, and we find out he lives with his parents (although his father is never introduced, his Mother and him are very close) and his cat Koko, who he is extremely attached to.
- Maggie, a slightly younger woman (estimated by Mary to be about eighteen years of age) who seems happy to go by the title of "Jack's Chick." She dislikes Mary intensely, and the pair never have any sort of friendly exchanges, but her appearance is described very explicitly; she is blonde, full figured, wears a lot of eyeliner, and generally carries off the retro "Beat" look very well. Although she seems rather acquiescent to the male characters in the book, she is openly hostile to Mary, because of Mary's attraction to Jack and her desire to infiltrate the group.
- Emily (Neal's mother) is on very close terms with her son and his friends. She shares some of their views and smokes cannabis both with and without the rest of them. She likes Mary on sight and encourages her relationship with Neal. She is also happy to follow unconventional life choices and consults the I Ching throughout the novel.
- Koko/Godot, a black cat who belongs to Neal. Despite not being human, Koko is an important character in the book. She is not anthropomorphised, so we never "hear" her think or speak, but her behaviour towards the novel's characters is rather communicative. She also has a pseudonym (she was originally called Godot, but was renamed by the group "Koko" after a Charlie Parker song) and her presence is important symbolically owing to her close relationship with Neal.

=== Minor characters ===
- Mary's parents, supportive and kind, but not actively involved in the plot.
- Lang, the uncle of a friend of the main characters, Otto Lang, (who we learn was a writer who committed suicide shortly before the novel begins). Lang is considerably older than the main characters in the book, yet is also involved with the Beat lifestyle. He enters the novel in part II, when Jack, Neal and Mary visit his house in Brighton.
- Claire, a friend of Mary, who only appears briefly at the start of the novel. It is she who first introduces Mary to the group.
