= Gordon Legge =

Gordon E. Legge
- Born: January 22, 1948 (age 78); Toronto, Ontario, Canada
- Awards: Helen Keller Prize for Vision Research (2015)
- Scientific career
- Fields: Psychology; Neuroscience
- Workplaces: University of Minnesota

Gordon Ernest Legge (born January 22, 1948) is currently the Distinguished McKnight University Professor and former chair of the Department of Psychology at the University of Minnesota. Legge is the director of the Minnesota Laboratory for Low-Vision Research.

Legge received a bachelor's degree in Physics from MIT in 1971, and a master's degree in Astronomy from Harvard in 1972. In 1976, Legge obtained his Ph.D. in Experimental Psychology from Harvard under the direction of R.J.W. Mansfield. Legge did his postdoctoral training with Fergus Campbell at the Physiological Laboratory, Cambridge University. In 1977, Legge joined the faculty of the University of Minnesota.

Legge studies the roles of vision in reading, object recognition, and spatial navigation. Legge's major research interest is in reading with normal vision and low vision (visual impairment). Legge is the author of a series of papers known as the "Psychophysics of Reading" series, published in peer-reviewed scientific journals between 1985 and 2002. These have been summarized and reviewed in the book "Psychophysics of reading in normal and low vision", which also contains a CDROM with the original articles.

Together with J. Stephen Mansfield, Legge also developed the MNREAD test , which has become an internationally accepted standard test for measurement of reading acuity and reading speed in low vision clinics and clinical research.

Legge also sat on the Committee on Currency Features Usable by the Visually Impaired, which reviewed the design of U.S. currency bills (banknotes) in 1995.
