= Michael Smith (writer) =

British writer, broadcaster and filmmaker

Michael Smith

Michael Smith (born 1976, in London) is an English writer, broadcaster and film-maker. He was brought up in Hartlepool, County Durham and graduated from University College London. His best-known work is The Giro Playboy.

== Writing ==
He began writing by producing a series of pamphlets which became collector's items and which he worked up into The Giro Playboy (Faber and Faber, 2006).

Shorty Loves Wing Wong (Faber and Faber, 2007), a prequel to The Giro Playboy, incorporating art by Jim Medway, was the follow-up.

Both Faber books were preceded by collectable limited editions, published by Simon Finch and To Hell, respectively. The Simon Finch edition collected together the early The Giro Playboy pamphlets and a compact disk of readings, set to music by collaborator Flora, packaged in a hand-stencilled pizza box. Shorty Loves Wing Wong was accompanied by an exhibition of Jim Medway's artwork at London's Paul Stolper Gallery.

Unreal City, Smith's third Faber book (September 2013), is a limited edition, with an accompanying CD of readings, combining music by Andrew Weatherall. Paperback and iBook versions will follow.

His writing has been anthologised in collections, including Oysteropolis, in On Nature (Harper, 2011), and extracts from The Giro Playboy in Reactions 5: New Poetry (Pen & Inc Press, University of East Anglia, 2005).

Smith has also written features for The Guardian and The Observer newspapers, The Idler, Zembla and Fire & Knives, as well as regular columns for magazines Dazed & Confused, Good For Nothing and Bare Bones/Le Gun.

== Broadcasting: BBC ==
Smith has written and presented two six-part TV series on BBC Four, Citizen Smith, examining what it means to be English (2008) and Michael Smith's Drivetime, a road movie exploring the cultural impact of the car (2009). As well as featuring Smith's mediations on the landscapes he encountered, the film also saw him meeting local people who offered a personal insight into their neighbourhoods, such as writer and comedian Lee Kern who was Michael's "spirit guide" into Edgware and the A41. They were followed by a one-hour televisual love-letter, A Journey Back to Newcastle: Michael Smith's Deep North (2010).

Both series were produced and directed by Simon Egan of Bedlam Productions, who went on to co-produce the multi-Oscar- and BAFTA-winning feature film, The King's Speech.

Smith frequently makes films for BBC2's The Culture Show - including a flâneur's hymn to shopping malls; the regenerating East End of London; and Dr Dee, the opera by Damon Albarn.

He has been heard on numerous radio stations, notably BBC Radio 3, BBC Radio 4, BBC London, and various regional stations.

== Films ==
Paris Postcards, a series of six short films for Eurostar in 2009, was followed by similar series exploring Amsterdam, Lyon and Avignon. The Amsterdam films were photographed by Danfung Dennis, whose documentary Hell and Back Again was a Sundance award winner.

Drift Street: Michael Smith's Guide to the Olympic Park, London 2012 was premiered on a narrowboat housing London's Floating Cinema.

Lost in London, his second short film as director, commissioned by CREATE, was premiered at the Barbican Centre, London.

His East London trilogy was completed in 2013 by Mystery River: a wander along the Lea, co-commissioned by The Floating Cinema and Luton's Departure Lounge Gallery.

== Live performance ==
Michael Smith regularly performs readings. He held residencies at London's Whitechapel Gallery and Shakespeare & Co in Paris. Festival gigs include the Edinburgh Festival, Glastonbury Festival, Durham Book Festival, Festival Number 6 (Portmeirion), Nova, Caught By The River Variety Show, Richmond-upon-Thames, Port Eliot Festival, Hay Festival, Clerkenwell, Hackney and the Crossing Border Festival in The Hague. London performances include The Colony Room Club, Queen Elizabeth Hall, Filthy Macnasty's, Boogaloo, Great Eastern Hotel and The Social. And he has read at small venues in Newcastle, Manchester, Glasgow and Edinburgh.
