= Apples (novel) =

2007 novel by Richard Milward

- Author: Richard Milward
- Language: English
- Publisher: Faber
- Publication date: 2007
- Publication place: United Kingdom
- Media type: Print (hardback & paperback)
- Pages: 208
- ISBN: 9780571232826
- OCLC: 76851601

Apples is the bestselling debut novel by Richard Milward, published in 2007. The novel was adapted into a play by John Rettallack.

== Plot summary ==
The book is set in Middlesbrough and follows the stories of teenagers Adam and Eve as they cope with the difficulties of growing up and the complications of friendship. Eve's mother has recently been diagnosed with cancer and as a distraction Eve becomes embroiled in sexual activity and drug taking, whilst Adam tries to cope with sexual frustration, a violent father and increasingly compulsive behaviour.

== Structure ==
The novel is narrated in the first person by several characters and at one point even by a butterfly, although the majority of the stories are narrated by the novel's central protagonists, Adam and Eve.

== Critical reception ==
Apples received positive reviews from critics upon its release, with the BBC review of the book stating that "Milward’s excellent debut finds poetry in his characters’ lives without romanticising their situation.".
