= Dan Kieran =

British travel writer and humourist (born 1975)

- Born: 10 June 1975 (age 51)
- Occupations: Author, editor, publisher
- Writing career
- Genres: Travel, Slow Movement
- Website: twitter.com/dan_kieran

Dan Kieran (born 10 June 1975) is a British travel writer, humourist, literary editor and entrepreneur. He is best known for his travel books and for his role as deputy editor of The Idler between 2000 and 2010. He is also co-founder (with John Mitchinson and Justin Pollard) of the publishing company Unbound and was its CEO for the first eleven years.

Kieran is author of Do Start: How to create and run a business that doesn't run you, The Surfboard,The Idle Traveller, I Fought The Law, Planes, Trains and Automobiles and Three Men In A Float (with Ian Vince).

Three Men In A Float became a half-hour BBC Radio 4 programme of the same name, which Kieran presented with Ian Vince and Prasanth Visweswaran. It aired on 27 February 2008.

Kieran is editor of Idler Books' Crap Jobs, Crap Holidays (Crap Vacations in the United States), The Book of Idle Pleasures; and co-editor of two volumes of Crap Towns.

His writing credits include The Observer, The Sunday Times, The Daily Telegraph, The Times and The Guardian.

== Published books ==
- Crap Jobs: 100 Tales of Workplace Hell (2005) Harper Paperbacks, ISBN 0-06-083341-6 Telegraph
- The Idler Book of Crap Towns: The 50 Crap Worst Places to Live in the UK (with Sam Jordison) (2006), Macmillan UK, ISBN 0-7522-1582-5
- The Idler Book of Crap Towns II (2006) Macmillan UK. ISBN 0-7522-2545-6 (Telegraph review
- The "Idler" Book of Crap Holidays (2005) Bantam, ISBN 0-553-81737-X
- How Very Interesting: Peter Cook's Universe and all that surrounds it (2006) Snow Books
- The Myway Code (with Ian Vince) (2006), Boxtree Ltd, ISBN 0-7522-2620-7
- I Fought the Law (2007), Bantam, ISBN 0-553-81769-8
- The Book Of Idle Pleasures (2008), Ebury Press
- Three Men In A Float (with Ian Vince) (2008), John Murray Ltd, ISBN 0-7195-9501-0
- Planes, Trains and Automobiles (2009), John Murray Ltd, ISBN 1-84854-014-0
- The Idle Traveller (2012), Automobile Association, ISBN 978-0749573423 Telegraph review
- The Surfboard (2018), Unbound, ISBN 978-1783526383
- Do Start (2023), The Do Book Company, ISBN 978-1914168178
