= Peter Koelewijn =

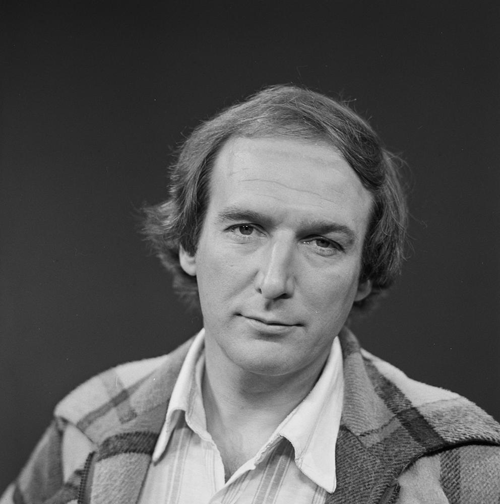
- Koelewijn in 1977

Background information
- Born: 29 December 1940 (age 85); Eindhoven, Netherlands
- Genres: Pop, rock
- Occupations: Singer, songwriter, producer
- Years active: 1957–present

Peter Koelewijn (born 29 December 1940) is a founding father of Dutch-language rock and roll. Koelewijn is also a successful producer and songwriter for other Dutch artists. His most famous song is "Kom van dat dak af".

== Biography ==
Peter Koelewijn was born on 29 December 1940, the son of a fishmonger in the southern Dutch city of Eindhoven. At the age of thirteen, he received his first guitar. In 1957, he started writing his first songs in English. He started his first band at secondary school with guitarists Karel Jansen and Roelof Egmond and singer Anneke Grönloh. Later on, Harry van Hoof (who later became a famous conductor), and drummer Peter van der Voort, joined the band. Around the same time, Grönloh left the band. Koelewijn has two children, Kim and Joep, who share his musical talent.

=== 1959–1969: Kom van dat dak af! ===
In 1959 the band, now called 'Peter and his Rockets', was joined by saxophone player Klaus Buchholz and bass guitarist Karel Jansen. In December, the band recorded "Kom Van Dat Dak Af" for record company Bovema. The combination of American rock and roll and Dutch lyrics was quite revolutionary at the time. In May 1960, "Kom Van Dat Dak Af" was a massive success in both the Netherlands and Belgium. Koelewijn, who moved on to grammar school, was told by his parents that he had to finish his schooling. Peter and His Rockets signed at Philips.

Follow-up singles "Laat Me Los" ("Let Me Go") and "Marijke" charted lower. By 1967 Koelewijn disbanded the Rockets to focus on writing and producing for other artists; he also hosted radio shows.

=== 1970s: Glamrock and first album ===
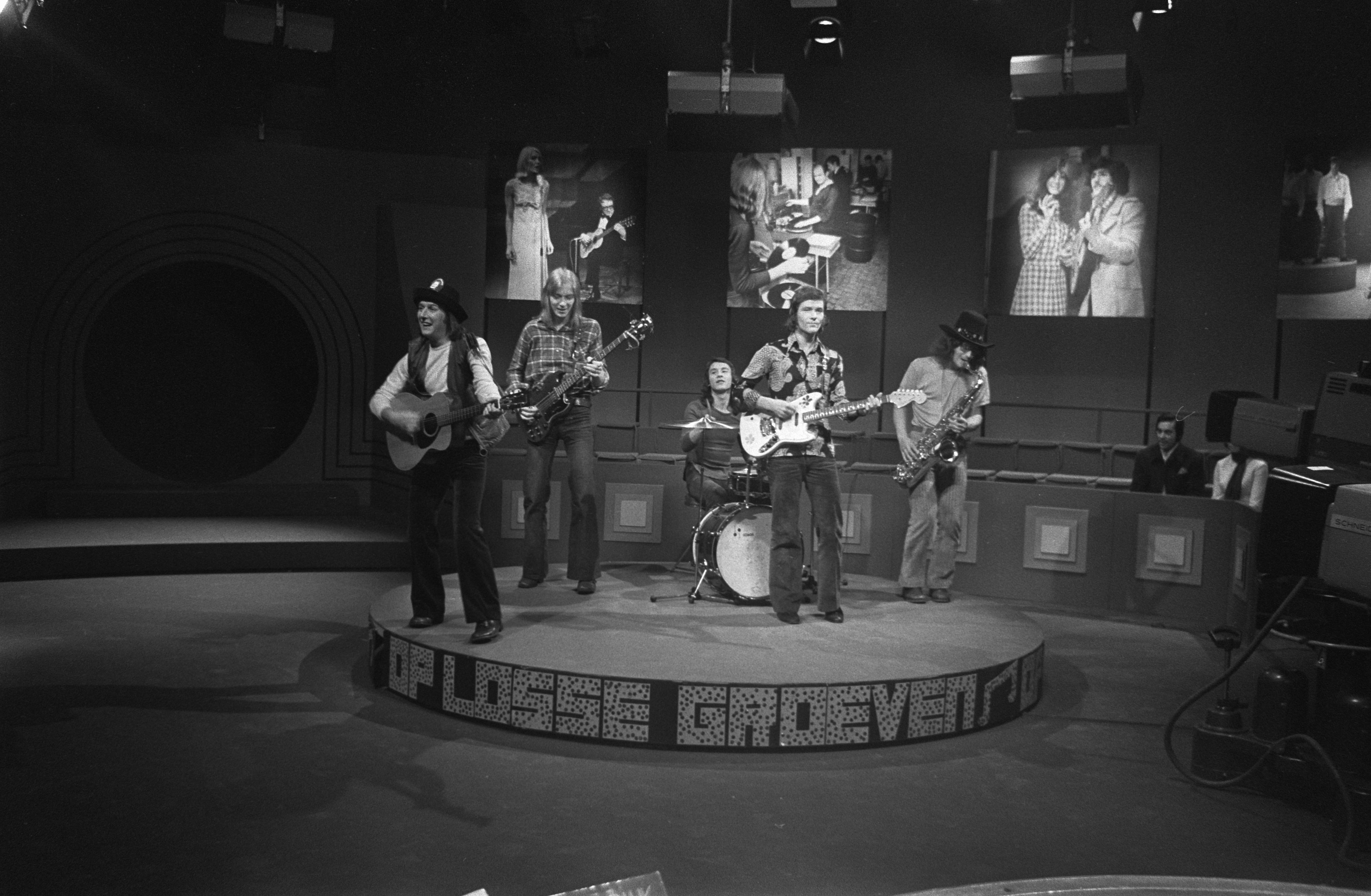
Peter and his Rockets in TV-show Op losse groeven (1971)

In 1970, he reformed the Rockets for what would become his glam rock era; this period lasted five years.

His 1973 composition, "Klap Maar in Je Handen" ("Clap Your Hands and Stamp Your Feet") was a no. 1 hit for South African singer Maria in South Africa and Rhodesia (now Zimbabwe), where it is still popular at dances.

In 1977, Koelewijn released his debut solo album Het Beste in Mij Is Niet Goed Genoeg Voor Jou (The Best I Can Give Is Still Unworthy Of You) which spawned two singles; the Rockets-like "Je Wordt Ouder Papa" ("You're Growing Older Papa"; a jocular comment by Golden Earring guitarist George Kooymans) and "KL 204 (Als Ik God Was)", originally intended as the lead single and reissued in 1990. Engelbert Humperdinck recorded the English version The Road To Nowhere, although Koelewijn had done likewise at the start. Flight 204 was released in 2019 on the bilingual album-reissue.

=== 1980s–1990s: New Rockets lineup and Gompie ===
In 1981, Koelewijn recruited musicians from the band Bunny for a new Rockets line-up that lasted till 1997; their first release was the live-album Peter Live of which "Kom Van Dat Dak Af" and "Klap Maar in Je Handen" hit the charts. In 1982, the band appeared in an insurance-commercial.

Early 1985, Koelewijn had a top 40 hit with "Sprong in Het Duister" ("Leap in the Dark"), the lead single of his otherwise unsuccessful second solo album. In 1987, he released "De Loop Van Een Geweer" ("Barrel of a Gun") which was loosely based on The Commodores' "Nightshift". In 1995, Koelewijn fronted the novelty group Gompie; their version of Smokie's "Living Next Door to Alice" topped the charts.

=== 2000s–2010s: Anniversaries, awards, and tributes ===
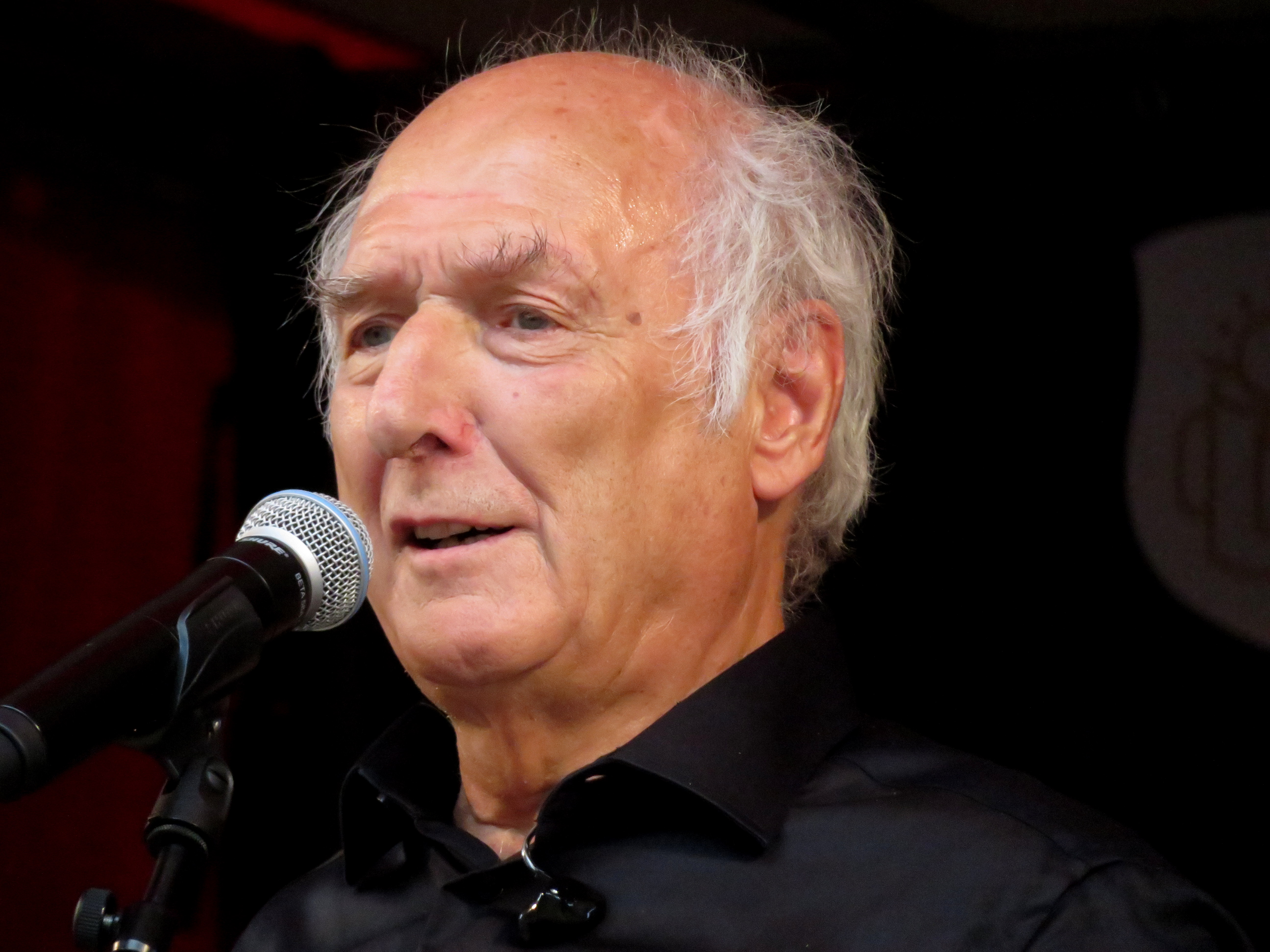
Koelewijn performing in Belgium in 2018

In 2002, Peter and His Rockets reformed for seven shows. In 2007, Koelewijn received a lifetime achievement award. A tribute concert was held where he performed a few songs himself. In 2008, Koelewijn appeared at the 50th-anniversary concert for Dutch pop. He opened the show by performing "Kom Van Dat Dak Af" as a duet with singer-songwriter Boudewijn de Groot. In 2009, the year of his own 50th career anniversary, Koelewijn released a solo album titled Een Gelukkig Man (A Happy Man). Koelewijn was a chairman of Buma/Stemra.

In 2011, Koelewijn appeared on the Ali B op volle toeren with rapper Typhoon. In 2013 he appeared in the Beste Zangers, selecting songs and cover versions from his own repertoire to be performed by the other contesters.

== Discography ==
=== Albums ===
- 1977: Het beste in mij is niet goed genoeg voor jou (The Best in Me Is Not Good Enough for You)
- 1981: Peter Live (live album of Peter and His Rockets)
- 1984: Diep Water (Deep Water)
- 1995: Het Album (The Album) (an album of songs performed by the cast of a popular Dutch soap opera, among those involved was Koelewijn)
- 1999: Out of Africa (Koelewijn assists Belgian singer Helmut Lotti in making Lotti's album of South African songs)
- 2001: New Country Love Songs (in collaboration with Grant & Forsyth)

=== Singles ===
- 1960: "Kom Van Dat Dak Af"/"Laat Me Los" ("Let Me Go") – Marijke
- 1968: "Kom uit de bedstee, mijn liefste" ("Come to My Bedside, My Darling") (with Egbert Douwe)
- 1968: "Waarom Zei Je Niets?" ("Why Didn't You Say Anything?")
- 1969: "Loekie Loekie"
- 1970: "The Bull and I"
- 1971: "Kom Van Dat Dak Af" (first re-release)
- 1972: "Angeline"/"Mij Oh Mij"/"Nassibal"/"Serafina"/"Veronica Sorry"
- 1974: "240042"
- 1974: "Veronica Sorry"
- 1977: "Je Wordt Ouder Papa" ("You're Getting Older Daddy")
- 1979: "Niet Geschoten Is Altijd Mis" ("Nothing Ventured, Nothing Gained")
- 1981: "Kom Van Dat Dak Af" (live version; second re-release)/"Klap Maar in Je Handen" ("Clap Your Hands") (live version)/"Van Washington Naar Moskou" (from Washington to Moscow)
- 1982: "Zolang De Motor Loopt" ("As Long As the Engine Keeps Running")
- 1983: "De Tijger Is Los" ("The Tiger Is Loose")/"Een Hete Zomer" ("A Hot Summer") (by Peter and His Rockets)
- 1984: "Sprong in Het Duister" ("Leap in the Dark")
- 1986: Big Ben (of Nôtre Dame) for Eurovision Song Contest in Brussels, Belgium – "Buiten Jou" ("Outside You") for Eurovision/"Rechtop in De Wind" ("Straight Up in the Wind") for Eurovision
- 1989: "Kom Van Dat Dak Af" (third re-release)/"My Roof Is Rainproof" (for the Dutch film Jan Rap en zijn Maat)
- 1990: "Allemaal Naar Voren! ('t Bestuur Ook!)" ("Everybody Forward! (Including the Management)") (with Ferdi Lancee)
- 1994: "I Love You Too" (with Helmut Lotti)
- 1995: "Een Minuut Nog Voor Een Leven Lang" ("One Minute More for an Entire Life") – Utopia

== Awards ==
- Edison Music Award — 1977
- Gouden Harp — 1977
