= Jaeger chart =

Diagnostic tool

The Jaeger chart is an eye chart used in testing near visual acuity. It is a card on which paragraphs of text are printed, with the text sizes increasing from 0.37 mm to 2.5 mm. This card is to be held by a patient at a fixed distance from the eye dependent on the J size being read. The smallest print that the patient can read determines their visual acuity. The original 1867 chart had a text containing seven paragraphs and a corresponding seven-point scale.

Jaeger cards are not standardized, and the variability of the actual size of test letters on different Jaeger cards currently in use is very high. Therefore, test results with different Jaeger cards are not comparable.

More commonly, distance vision acuity is tested using the Snellen chart, familiarly seen wall mounted with a large letter at the top.
