= Deadkidsongs =

2001 novel by Toby Litt

deadkidsongs
- First edition
- Author: Toby Litt
- Language: English
- Genre: black comedy
- Publisher: Hamish Hamilton
- Publication date: 2001
- Publication place: United Kingdom
- Media type: Print (Hardback & Paperback)
- ISBN: 0-241-14070-6
- OCLC: 46602526
- Dewey Decimal: 823/.914 21
- LC Class: PR6062.I827 D43 2001

deadkidsongs is a 2001 novel by Toby Litt. The story is a black comedy about friendship, loyalty, love, hate and revenge in the fictional English town of Amplewick, and centers on four main characters: Andrew, Matthew, Paul and Peter, who form "Gang".

deadkidsongs is Litt's fourth novel, published by Hamish Hamilton. John Preston of the Sunday Telegraph called it "the most exciting new British novel I've read this year... extraordinarily haunting".

== Plot summary ==
The plot centers on Gang, a gang of four boys who play War, led by "the Best Father". All boys envy Andrew for having such a nice dad, while Paul's father is considered "the worst father", a reputation he was never able to shake off, after having told off Andrew's father for neglecting an accident that involved Matthew falling out of a tree.

However, their revenge on Paul's father has to make way quickly for a much more serious operation. When Matthew dies of meningitis, and Andrew's father mentions the fact that Matthew's grandparents did not take him to the doctor's in time, the three boys decide to take revenge on them, blaming them for the death of their gang member.

Matthew's grandparents, who became substitute parents for him and his sister Miranda, when their parents died in a car crash, are touched by the boys' helpful attitude towards them, and welcome them in their home, not knowing that they're the worst enemy they'll ever know.

By then, Andrew, Paul and Peter have started calling them "the Dinosaurs", and their only goal is to "have them extinct by Christmas". A horrific battle ensues, and while Andrew and Paul start fighting for the leadership of Gang, things get out of control.

== Reviews ==
- Literary Review: "Litt is rare among younger novelists in having published nothing except good work... an exciting and terrifying novel, deadkidsongs speaks eloquently of the attractions of youthful violence, at the same time as presenting a more sceptical perspective on the boys. It deserves its place alongside Litt's other outstanding works."
- The Daily Telegraph: "Should put Toby Litt firmly and deservedly in the big league. An extraordinary book, one of the most disturbing I have ever read... By the end one is appalled, yet strangely exhilarated. It's dauntingly good."
- The Face: "Daring... As black as comedy gets before it becomes something else entirely."

== Trivia ==
- The title deadkidsongs, which is always written without spacing or capitalisation, borrows from the title of Gustav Mahler's Kindertotenlieder, (songs on the death of Children).
- deadkidsongs is the fourth book by Toby Litt, and therefore the title starts with a D, the fourth letter of the alphabet.
