= Toby Litt =

English writer and academic (born 1968)

Toby Litt FRSL
- Born: 1968 (age 57–58); Ampthill, England
- Education: Worcester College, Oxford; University of East Anglia
- Occupations: Writer and academic

Toby Litt FRSL (born 1968) is an English writer and academic based at the University of Southampton.

== Life ==
Litt was born in Ampthill, England, in 1968. He was educated at Bedford Modern School, read English at Worcester College, Oxford, and studied Creative Writing at the University of East Anglia, where he was taught by Malcolm Bradbury.

== Career ==
A short story by Litt was included in the anthology All Hail the New Puritans (2000), edited by Matt Thorne and Nicholas Blincoe, and he has edited The Outcry (2001), Henry James's last completed novel, for Penguin in the UK. In 2003, Litt was nominated by Granta magazine as one of the 20 "Best of Young British Novelists", although his work since then has met with mixed reviews, one reviewer in The Guardian writing that his novel I Play the Drums in a Band Called Okay "goes on ... and on, and on. There is plenty of story here, but little plot, and no tension."

Litt edited the 13th edition of New Writing (the British Council's annual anthology of the finest contemporary writing in fiction, non-fiction and poetry) and is known for naming his books in alphabetical order.

Litt wrote an interactive short story, using LiveJournal and Twitter, as part of the Penguin We Tell Stories project. He is currently an associate professor in creative writing at the University of Southampton, and led the campaign to get Arvind Mehrotra elected as the Oxford Professor of Poetry following Ruth Padel's resignation. In 2011, he took part in the Bush Theatre's Sixty-Six Books project, for which he wrote a piece based upon a book of the King James Bible.

Litt was elected a Fellow of the Royal Society of Literature in 2023.

== Bibliography ==
=== Fiction ===
- Adventures in Capitalism (collection of short stories, 1996, ISBN 0-14-100795-8)
- Beatniks (1997, ISBN 0-14-101793-7)
- Corpsing (2000, ISBN 0-14-028577-6)
- deadkidsongs (2001, ISBN 0-14-028578-4)
- Exhibitionism (collection of short stories, 2002, ISBN 0-14-100653-6)
- Finding Myself (2003, ISBN 0-14-100654-4)
- Ghost Story (2004, ISBN 0-241-14278-4)
- Hospital, (2007, ISBN 0-241-14280-6)
- I Play the Drums in a Band Called Okay (2008, ISBN 978-0-241-14282-0)
- Journey into Space (2009, ISBN 978-0-14-103971-8)
- King Death (2010, ISBN 978-0-14-103972-5)
- Lilian's Spell Book (2013, ISBN 978-1999802103)
- Life-Like (2014, ISBN 978-0857422071)
- Monster (in The Book of Other People, ed. Zadie Smith, 2007)
- Notes For A Young Gentleman (2018, ISBN 978-0857424853)
- O (short stories - exists)
- Patience (2019, ISBN 978-1910296998)

=== Comic books ===
- Dead Boy Detectives (2014)

=== Non-fiction ===
- Wrestliana (2018, ISBN 978-1910296912)
