= Crap Towns =

British book series

First editions

Crap Towns: The 50 Worst Places to Live in the UK, Crap Towns II: The Nation Decides, and Crap Towns Returns: Back by Unpopular Demand, are a series of books edited by Sam Jordison and Dan Kieran, in association with UK quarterly The Idler; in which towns in the United Kingdom were nominated by visitors to The Idler website for their "crapness", with the results being published in The Idler and in the books. A sister publication, Crap Jobs, was created by similar means, and Crap Holidays was published in October 2006. In June 2012, the editors announced that they were gathering nominations for a third edition of Crap Towns (published 2013).

== Controversy ==
Publication of Crap Towns brought widespread criticism from residents, politicians and other notable figures from the towns listed.

Many notable figures were quick to defend their respective towns. These included a number of MPs, such as Michael Howard, who represented Hythe in Kent, which appeared at number four in the 2003 edition. Howard said that Hythe was "the jewel of Kent."

Some thought the selection process and/or subsequent portrayals to be inherently biased, "random", subjective, inconsistent and/or unscientific. The editors of the book wrote to "local worthies" in each of the nominated towns to gain their responses and views. Local newspapers were quick to defend their towns, such as the Stockport Express in 2006.

Conversely, some former residents have tended to agree with the assessments, such as Sarfraz Manzoor, writing about Luton in The Guardian (2006). However, Manzoor also concluded that there was "of course, an unmistakable air of snobbery around the people behind such a book; the stench of rich kids having fun at the expense of those less able to afford to be professionally idle" and added that "rather than sneering at towns such as Luton, we should be applauding the contribution that crap towns have made to all our lives."

== Survey results ==
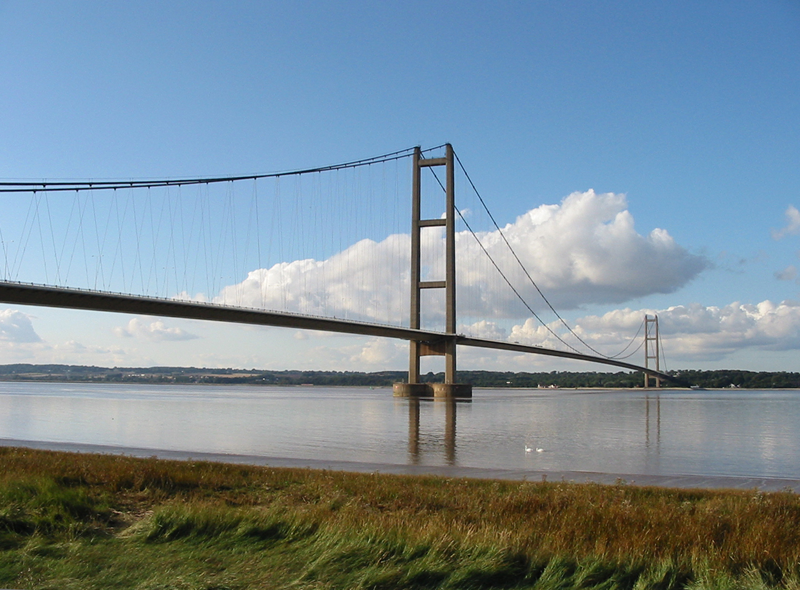
Hull was the inaugural "winner" of Crap Towns in 2003.

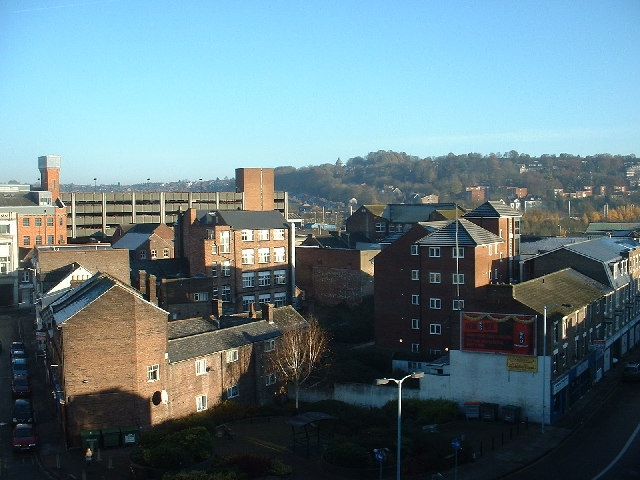
Luton was the 2004 "winner".

Readers voted for the top 50 crap towns in the UK. The top ten by reader votes in descending order of "crapness" (with 1 being the worst) were:

Rank	2003	2004	2013
1	Hull	Luton	London
2	Cumbernauld	Windsor	Bradford
3	Morecambe	Sunderland	Chipping Norton
4	Hythe	Edinburgh & Glasgow (tied)	Southampton
5	Winchester	—	York
6	Liverpool	Clapham, London	Gibraltar
7	St Andrews	Bath	Coventry
8	Bexhill-on-Sea	Nottingham	Nuneaton
9	Basingstoke	Corby	High Wycombe
10	Hackney, London	Middlesbrough	Stoke-on-Trent

== See also ==
- Yellow journalism
