= Daren King =

English novelist and children's writer

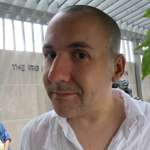
- Self-portrait, June 2009
- Born: Laurence Daren King; 1972 (age 53–54); Harlow, Essex, England
- Occupation: Writer
- Writing career
- Period: 1999–present
- Genres: Literary novels, children's mystery and supernatural fiction
- Literary movement: New Puritans

Laurence Daren King (born 1972 in Harlow, Essex) is an English novelist and children's writer. His debut novel, Boxy an Star, made the shortlist for the Guardian First Book Award and the ten finalists for the Booker Prize in 1999. He won the Nestlé Children's Book Prize gold medal in the 6 to 8-year-old readers category for Mouse Noses on Toast in 2006.

== Biography ==
Daren King was born in Harlow, Essex in 1972. He left school with one O-level, but later graduated from a creative writing course at Bath Spa University College.

== Works ==
Whilst studying in Bath, King wrote his first novel, Boxy an Star, which was then published by Abacus in 1999. The book was shortlisted for the Guardian First Book Award and longlisted for the Booker Prize. The same year he contributed to a book of erotica published by Zadie Smith when she was writer in residence at the Institute of Contemporary Arts.

By virtue of contributing a short story to the anthology All Hail the New Puritans in 2000, King became part of the New Puritans, a short-lived literary movement. The editors of the anthology, Nicholas Blincoe and Matt Thorne, appear in his novel Jim Giraffe as the characters Mr Bingo and Ape Hands.

In 2006, King published his first children's book Mouse Noses on Toast. It was illustrated by David Roberts. The two have since collaborated on more books.

== Selected publications ==
=== Adult fiction ===
- Boxy an Star ISBN 0-349-11192-8 (Abacus, 1999)
- Jim Giraffe ISBN 978-0-09-944516-6 Vintage, 2005)
- Tom Boler ISBN 978-0-09-944515-9 (Vintage, 2005)
- Manual ISBN 978-0-571-23066-2 (Faber & Faber, 2008)

=== Children's fiction ===
- Mouse Noses on Toast, illustrated by David Roberts (Faber, 2006)
- Sensible Hare and the Case of Carrots, illus. Roberts (Faber, 2007)
- Peter the Penguin Pioneer, illus. Roberts (Quercus, 2009)
- Frightfully Friendly Ghosties, illus. Roberts (Quercus, 2010 to 2012) – series of four novellas

=== Adult cartoon ===
- Smally the Mouse: Smally's Party ISBN 978-0-7475-7903-8 (Bloomsbury, 2005)

=== Other ===
- Contributor to All Hail the New Puritans, an anthology of stories edited by Nicholas Blincoe and Matt Thorne ISBN 978-1-84115-349-0 (Fourth Estate, 2000)
