= Boxy an Star =

1999 novel by Daren King

- First edition
- Author: Daren King
- Language: English
- Publisher: Abacus (UK)
- Publication date: 1999
- Publication place: United Kingdom
- Media type: Print (Paperback)
- Pages: 244 pp (Paperback edition)
- ISBN: 0-349-11191-X
- OCLC: 43070024

Boxy an Star is the first novel by English author Daren King. It was shortlisted for the 1999 Guardian First Book Award, and longlisted for the Booker Prize. The book is notable for its unusual futuristic vernacular style, reminiscent of works such as A Clockwork Orange or The Book of Dave.

== Plot summary ==
Boxy an Star tells the story of the relationship between two young lovers, 'Bole' (Thomas Boler) and 'Star' (Stacey Brain), Bole being the narrator of the story. The 'Boxy' in the title is the couple's friend and drug dealer.

After a party at Boxy's flat, at which Bole and Star consume a large number of Boxy's spangles and Es and confuse a duvet with a bag of drugs, they go to visit Star's friend Prim and have afternoon tea. Invited to stay the night, the pair later awake and, forgetting where they are, become frightened and decide to escape, encountering Prim's boyfriend Gary on the way who they think is a 'Mephisto Conjurer' due to his 'smoking stick'.

== Characters ==
- Thomas "Bole" Boler — the main character and the novel's narrator.
- Stacy "Star" Brain — Tom's girlfriend.

=== Minor characters ===
- Prim - a posh bohemian alcoholic. Referred to only as Prim in Boxy an Star but by the full name Primula Spatula in the prequel Tom Boler.

== Film ==
The book was optioned to be directed by the English photographer Rankin.
