= Matt Thorne =

British novelist, writer, and journalist

- Born: Matthew Thorne; 1974 (age 51–52); United Kingdom
- Occupation: Novelist
- Writing career
- Language: English
- Genre: Fiction

Matthew "Matt" Thorne (born 1974) is an English novelist, writer, and journalist.

== Life and career ==
Thorne grew up in Bristol, England, and was educated at Sidney Sussex College, Cambridge. Thorne's first book, Tourist, was published in 1998. The book is an attack on the negative effects of tourism on Weston-super-Mare, an English seaside town near Bristol. His second book Eight Minutes Idle, which drew on Thorne's experiences of having worked in a call centre, was published in 1999 and won an Encore Award. Thorne's 2004 novel, Cherry, was longlisted for the Booker Prize. He is now married to Lesley Thorne and they have two sons, Luke and Tom.

Thorne is a regular book reviewer for national newspapers, has written screenplays and plays for radio, and a trilogy of books for young adults, the 39 Castles series, which chronicles the adventures of a group of high-spirited children. These novels create an imaginary England of the future where the modern day world has collapsed and where society has reverted to earlier ways, resembling medieval England. The world of these novels is similar to the England imagined by Richard Jefferies in his novel After London, to which Thorne alludes in the final book of the trilogy, The White Castle. In 2000, Thorne and his fellow novelist Nicholas Blincoe co-founded a minor literary movement, the New Puritans, whose Dogme-style manifesto pledged to bring simplicity and relevance back to contemporary British fiction. He is currently a writer-in-residence for the charity First Story.

In 2012, he published Prince on the artist of the same name. In 2014, a film adaptation of 8 Minutes Idle was released by BBC Films.

Thorne is a Senior Lecturer in Creative Writing at Royal Holloway, University of London.
