= Nicholas Blincoe =

English author, critic and screenwriter (born 1965)

Hackney London Borough Councillor for Hoxton West
- Incumbent
- Assumed office 8 May 2026

Personal details
- Born: 1965 (age 60–61) Rochdale, Lancashire, England
- Party: Green
- Education: Middlesex Polytechnic; University of Warwick (PhD)
- Occupation: Author, Critic, Screenwriter

Nicholas Blincoe (born 1965) is an English author, critic and screenwriter. He is the author of six novels: Acid Casuals (1995), Jello Salad (1997), Manchester Slingback (1998), The Dope Priest (1999), White Mice (2002), and Burning Paris (2004). He was a founding member of the New Puritans literary movement and co-edited (with Matt Thorne) the anthology All Hail The New Puritans (2000) which included contributions from Alex Garland, Toby Litt, Geoff Dyer, Daren King, Simon Lewis, and Scarlett Thomas. Blincoe is also a Green Party councillor in Hackney.

== Early life ==
Blincoe was born in Rochdale, Lancashire, in 1965. After briefly studying art at Middlesex Polytechnic he attended the University of Warwick where he studied Philosophy, gaining a PhD in 1993. His doctoral advisor was the controversial philosopher Nick Land, who Blincoe has since denounced. The thesis, entitled Derrida and Economics: The Economics of Depression, explored the relationship between political sciences and economic theories, with particular reference to the philosophy of Jacques Derrida.

== Career ==
Blincoe released a Hip-Hop record on Manchester's Factory Records in 1987 and his subsequent relationship with Factory records and the nightclub The Haçienda informed his early work. In 1995, Blincoe married the Bethlehem Palestinian filmmaker Leila Sansour, director of the documentary Jeremy Hardy vs. the Israeli Army (2003), they divorced in 2018. He lives in Shoreditch with his partner, TV exec Janet Lee

== Screenwriting ==
Blincoe has written for British radio and television, including episodes of the BBC TV series Waking The Dead and Channel 4's Goldplated. As a critic and reviewer he has worked for the Modern Review, under the editorship of Toby Young and Julie Burchill. He was a columnist for the London Daily Telegraph until September 2006, writing the weekly 'Marginalia' column.

== Publications ==
He is the author of six novels, Acid Casuals (1995), Jello Salad (1997), Manchester Slingback (1998), The Dope Priest (1999), White Mice (2002), Burning Paris (2004). He was a founding member of the New Puritans literary movement and co-edited (with Matt Thorne) the anthology 'All Hail The New Puritans' (2000) which included contributions from Alex Garland, Toby Litt, Geoff Dyer, Daren King, Simon Lewis, and Scarlett Thomas. In 2017 his history of Bethlehem was published, Bethlehem: Biography of a Town.

Blincoe won the Crime Writers' Association Silver Dagger for his novel Manchester Slingback in 1998. His early novels were crime thrillers set in or around his native Lancashire and the clubs of Manchester.

Some of his more recent novels reflect his life split between homes in London and Bethlehem. He is a co-editor of a book on the International Solidarity Movement Peace Under Fire: Israel/Palestine and the International Solidarity Movement (2003) with Josie Sandercock, Radhika Sainath, Marissa McLaughlin, Hussein Khalili, Huwaida Arraf and Ghassan Andoni. In 2019 he released "More Noble Than War: The Story of Football in Israel and Palestine"

Blincoe's book, Oliver Twist & Me: The True Story of my Family and Charles Dickens's best-loved novel, was published in September 2025. This details the connections between Blincoe's ancestor Robert Blincoe, an orphaned workhouse boy, Oliver Twist and Charles Dickens. It was shortlisted for the James Tait Black Memorial Prize for biography in 2026.
