= Louise L. Sloan =

Vision scientist (1898-1982)

Louise Littig Sloan
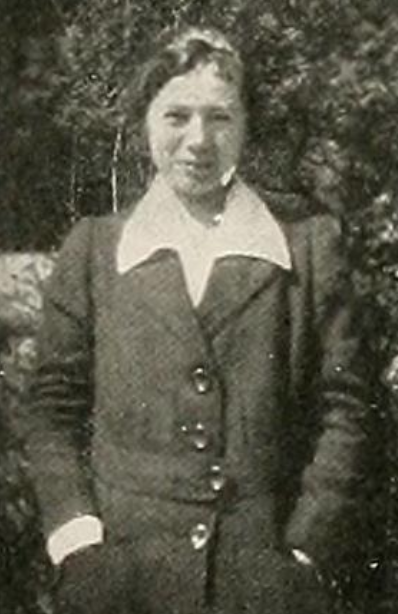
- Louise L. Sloan, from the 1920 yearbook of Bryn Mawr College
- Born: May 31, 1898; Baltimore, Maryland, United States
- Died: March 1, 1982 (aged 83); Baltimore, Maryland
- Other names: Sloanie
- Education: Bryn Mawr School; Bryn Mawr College; Johns Hopkins University
- Spouse: William M. Rowland
- Medical career
- Profession: Ophthalmologist
- Institutions: Johns Hopkins University; Bryn Mawr College; Harvard University
- Awards: Edgar D. Tillyer Award (1971); Distinguished Alumna Award – Bryn Mawr School (1971); Lighthouse Pisart Vision Award (1981)

Louise Littig Sloan (May 31, 1898 – March 1, 1982) was an American ophthalmologist and vision scientist. She is credited for being a pioneer of the sub-division of clinical vision research, contributing more than 100 scientific articles in which she either authored or co-authored. Her most notable work was in the area of visual acuity testing where she developed and improved equipment. Sloan received her Ph.D. from Bryn Mawr College in experimental psychology. She spent a short period of time in both Bryn Mawr's experimental psychology program as well as the Department of Ophthalmology at Harvard Medical School. The majority of her career, however, was spent at Johns Hopkins Wilmer Eye Institute where she directed the Wilmer Laboratory of Physiological Optics for 44 years. In 1971, Sloan was the second woman awarded the prestigious Edgar D. Tillyer Award by Optica (formerly Optical Society (OSA) for her many achievements in the field of vision.

== Early life and education ==
Sloan was born in Baltimore, Maryland on May 31, 1898. She was also raised in Baltimore where she attended the private, all girls' college-preparatory school, Bryn Mawr School. This is where she first was affectionately nicknamed "Sloanie" by her peers – a name that would follow her throughout her career. Sloan graduated from the Bryn Mawr School in 1916 where she received a scholarship for her studies in mathematics. Later in 1971, she also received the Distinguished Alumna Award from Bryn Mawr School.

A year after graduating from Bryn Mawr School, Sloan continued her studies in 1917 at Bryn Mawr College in Bryn Mawr, Pennsylvania. In 1920, she graduated with a bachelor's degree from Bryn Mawr College. Sloan then returned to Baltimore, Maryland to study as a graduate in the physics program at Johns Hopkins University. After her time at Johns Hopkins, Sloan headed back to Bryn Mawr, Pennsylvania and eventually earned her doctorate (Ph.D.) in experimental psychology from Bryn Mawr College in 1926. During her time at Bryn Mawr College, she was mentored by Clarence Ferree and Gertrude Rand as she began her work in ophthalmology.

== Career ==
After receiving her Ph.D. from Bryn Mawr College, Sloan continued to work for the institution as an instructor of experimental psychology until 1928. Following her two-year stint, she began work at Harvard Medical School as a research assistant in ophthalmology. In 1929, her previous professors at Bryn Mawr College, Clarence Ferree and Gertrude Rand, invited her to join the Wilmer Eye Institute at Johns Hopkins University, where she directed the laboratory of physiological optics and ophthalmology until the end of her professional career in 1973.

=== Service in World War II ===
In 1942, Sloan's time at Johns Hopkins's Wilmer Institute was halted for a period of time in which she worked for the Air Force's School of Aviation Medicine at Randolph Field in San Antonio, Texas as an ophthalmologist and vision research investigator. At first, Sloan declined the Air Force's job offer and didn't agree until her husband and frequent collaborator, William M. Rowland, was also offered a position.

During her time in San Antonio, Sloan focused her work on color vision and color vision testing. It was at this time that she developed the Sloan color vision test which is used by the Air Force, as well as the Farnsworth Lantern Test which is used by the Navy. This work gave her the respected title of a "color vision authority." In 1945, she concluded her work with the Air Force and returned to Johns Hopkins Medical School and Hospital.

== Research and publications ==
Sloan contributed greatly to the scientific community, with over a hundred authored and co-authored articles in a number of research areas. One of the most prominent articles in her early years of research was based on a 1936 study. This article discussed an idiopathic macular disease which has been identified as central serous retinopathy. In the study, Sloan conducted "comparative determinations of the light minimum" of the investigated eyes, in the process devising a novel method we now term static perimetry. In addition, the tests for impairments in visual function aided the development of diagnosing macropsia, micropsia, and metamorphopsia. Some of her other significant works in the field ophthalmology included a study, in 1950, on threshold gradients of rods and cones in the eye. This study involved an experimental procedure that measured "the decrease in thresholds during adaptation to darkness or to a low brightness level after previous adaptation of the eye to a high brightness," which allowed threshold reductions in rods and cones to be measured separately from one another. Another important research involved experiments in red-green color blindness patients. Sloan also contributed greatly to the creation of the First International Standard for Visual Field Testing committee, where she represented the American optics and visual physiology committee.

=== Sloan letters ===
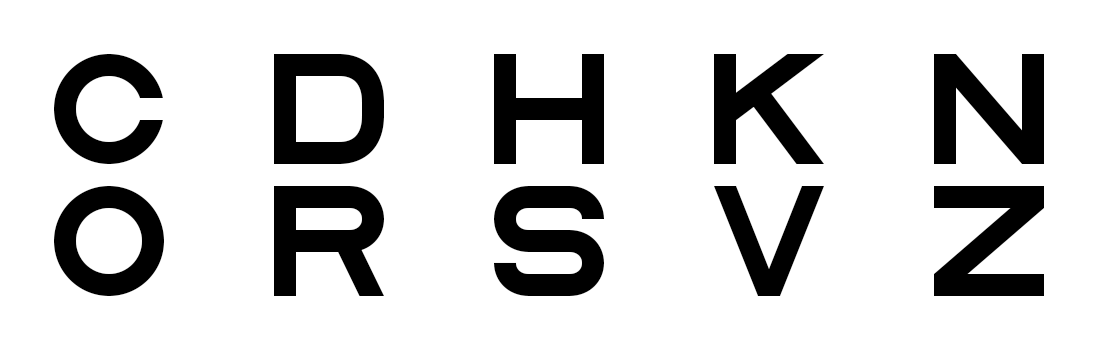
Ten Sloan Optotypes

Among the various contributions made by Sloan to ophthalmologic and optical research, her most well-known work is the creation of the Sloan letters, used to test visual acuity. These ten optotypes, according to Sloan, were specifically chosen from capital letters of the alphabet in an article written in 1959, in order to reduce existing inefficiencies present in other visual acuity test charts. The set consists of the letters Z, N, H, R, V, K, D, C, O, and S, chosen for their qualities of consisting of horizontal, vertical, curved, and slanted lines, which helps perform "subjective tests for determination of the error of refraction." Compared to the previous Snellen Chart letters, Sloan letters do not have serifs, although they do follow the traditional principle that the "overall height and width are five times the width of the strokes."

Sloan letters are commonly used in more modern visual acuity tests, such as the LogMAR chart.

== Personal life ==
Sloan was married to William M. Rowland who was a private-practicing ophthalmologist in Baltimore, Maryland. The couple often collaborated on research and projects related to ophthalmology. Louise Littig Sloan died from an unspecified "long, debilitating illness" on March 1, 1982, at 83 years old.

== Legacy ==
Sloan's lifetime of work in the area of visual acuity testing continues to have many longstanding applications to the work done in the field today. From her development of the Lantern Test to the Sloan Letters, she stands as an important figure in America's history of ophthalmology and vision science. Sloan is remembered by her colleagues, friends, students and patients for her “boundless enthusiasm, stimulating companionship, and kind counsel and encouragement.”

== Medical and scientific societies ==
Sloan was a member of the following organizations:

- National Institutes of Health – Vision Study Section
- American Medical Association – Committee on Optics and Visual Physiology
- National Academy of Sciences – National Research Council Committee on Vision
- Editorial Advisory Board of Vision Research and Experimental Eye Research
- Optical Society (OSA) Fellow - one of the 115 members of the first class of OSA Fellows in 1959, one of only 5 women (including Christine Ladd-Franklin, Charlotte Moore Sitterly, Dorothy Nickerson, Gertrude Rand, and Mary E Warga) in the class.

== Awards and recognition ==
List of Awards and Recognition Presented to Louise Littig Sloan
Date	Honor	Description
1953	Named head of optotypes subcommittee	The American Medical Association named Sloan in charge of "recommending standards for visual acuity charts" on the Optotypes subcommittee of Optics and Visual Physiology
1971	Edgar D. Tillyer Award	Presented by the Optical Society (OSA) in "recognition of her many distinguishable accomplishments in the field of vision"
1971	Distinguished Alumna Award	Presented by Bryn Mawr School in Baltimore, Maryland
1974	Dedication of Scientific Meeting	Presented by Wilmer Residents Association
1981	Lighthouse Pisart Vision Award	The first recipient of the award presented annually by Lighthouse Guild to a "vision clinician, scientist or clinician-scientist whose contributions have the potential to substantially influence vision care and/or vision science and has a proven record of accomplishment"
1981	Dedication of Interdisciplinary Symposium	Presentation on Visual Systems conducted by Wilmer Ophthalmological Institute in order to "recognize and honor Dr. Sloan's achievements"
