= Sloan letters =

Set of optotypes used to test visual acuity

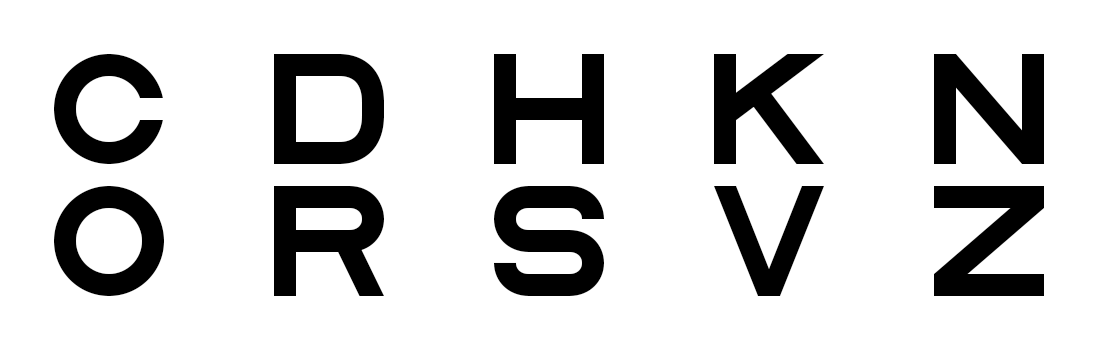
Sloan letters as described in the original article of Louise L. Sloan (1959).

Sloan letters, designed by American ophthalmologist Louise Sloan in 1959, are a set of optotypes used to test visual acuity generally used in Snellen charts, logMAR charts and ETDRS charts.

These letters, unlike the ones used in older Snellen charts, are designed to give acuity testing results that are comparable to tests made using Landolt rings. Computer fonts for macOS and Microsoft Windows operating systems are available for research purposes. The fonts are based on Sloan's design, which has been designated the US standard for acuity testing by the National Academy of Sciences, National Research Council, Committee on Vision (1980, Adv Ophthalmol, 41, 103–148).

== History ==
Visual acuity charts prior to the mid-1900s often relied on Snellen letters or the Landolt C, but these did not always provide comparable results because of problems in consistency and spacing. To address this, Sloan developed a new set of ten specially formed letters: C, D, H, K, N, O, R, S, V, and Z. Unlike earlier optotypes, they were designed to be equally recognizable. Each letter was picked and tested to ensure that difficulty was consistent among all the letters.

Sloan officially published her set in 1959 while working at Johns Hopkins University. Over time, researchers and clinicians started adopting the Sloan letters to test visual acuity. Their consistency and precise geometric shape made it ideal for new chart designs. This ultimately lead to their use in the LogMAR charts and the Early Treatment Diabetic Retinopathy Study (ETDRS) chart, which is now one of the preferred charts for visual acuity testing.

== Design ==
The ten Sloan letters are fit within a 5x5 grid, with each letter's height equal to its width. To ensure the proportions are consistent across all the letters, the stroke width is set to one-fifth of each letter's height. This concept is similar to that used for Snellen letters. However, unlike the Snellen letters, Sloan letters do not have serifs and are more geometrically balanced.

Each letter was chosen and tested for equal difficulty and recognition. On the charts, both letter and row spacing are scaled relative to letter size. Each character is separated from the next by a distance equal to one letter-width and the space between each row matched the height of the letters on the smaller line. This spacing reduces the "crowding phenomenon" that was typically seen in Snellen charts. Sloan compared the performance on her new letter set to the Landolt C, an optotype commonly used as the standard for visual acuity testing. Her goal was to produce a set that matched the Landolt C in accurate measurement, while providing letters that were easy for patients in practice.

The arrangement of letter size on Sloan-based charts follows a logarithmic scale. Each line of letters decrease by 1.26 logarithmic units, which resulted in the size doubling for every three lines. This meant that the shift of three lines on the chart corresponds to the same amount of visual change at any point on the scale. This design also allowed the testing distance to be adjusted without affecting the measurement. Moving the chart closer by a 0.1 log unit enlarges the letters by 25%, allowing the patient to read one additional line and still getting the accurate results.

== Usage ==
Sloan letters are widely used in both clinical and research settings to assess visual acuity. They are incorporated into LogMAR and the ETDRs charts. Because of the updated design of the letters, many clinicians have recommended switching from older charts to those that use these Sloan letters. In these charts, letters are given in lines of decreasing size, with each line typically containing 5 Sloan letters designed for minimal bias. These charts are now also used in school vision screenings for children and provide a reliable method to detect any visual impairments at an early age.

== See also ==
- Eye chart
- Landolt C
- Lea test
- Snellen chart
- LogMAR
