= Emmetropia =

State of vision

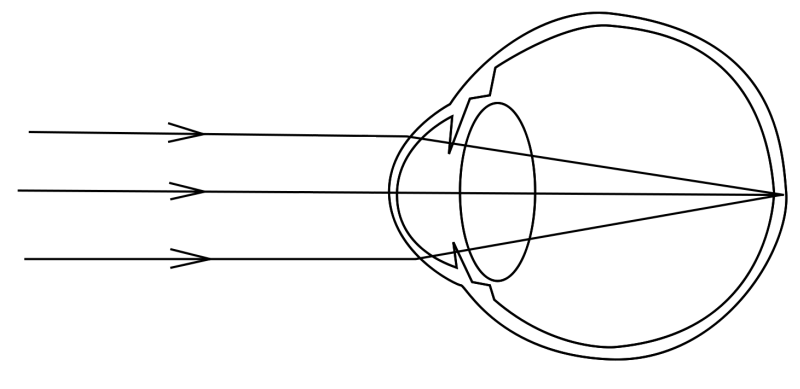
- Specialty: Ophthalmology

Emmetropia is the state of vision in which a faraway object at infinity is in sharp focus with the ciliary muscle in a relaxed state. That condition of the normal eye is achieved when the refractive power of the cornea and eye lens and the axial length of the eye balance out, which focuses rays exactly on the retina, resulting in perfectly sharp distance vision. A human eye in a state of emmetropia requires no corrective lenses for distance; the vision scores well on a visual acuity test (such as an eye chart test).

While emmetropia implies an absence of myopia, hyperopia, and other optical aberrations such as astigmatism, a less strict definition requires the spherical equivalent to be between −0.5 and +0.5 D and low enough aberrations such that 20/20 vision is achieved without correction.

For example, on a Snellen chart test, emmetropic eyes score at least "6/6"(m) or "20/20"(ft) vision, meaning that at a distance of 20 ft (the first number) they see as well as a "normal" eye at a distance of 20 ft (the second number). Eyes that have enough myopia (near-sighted), hyperopia (far-sighted, excluding latent and facultative hyperopia), or optical aberrations would score worse, e.g. 20/40 (visual acuity of 0.5). Typical emmetropic vision might be 20/15 to 20/10 (visual acuity of 1.3 to 2).

Emmetropes with presbyopia might use lenses for near vision.

== Overview ==
Emmetropia is a state in which the eye is relaxed and focused on an object more than 6 meters or 20 feet away. The light rays coming from that object are essentially parallel, and the rays are focused on the retina without effort. If the gaze shifts to something closer, light rays from the source are too divergent to be focused without effort. In other words, the eye is automatically focused on things in the distance unless a conscious effort is made to focus elsewhere. For a wild animal or human prehistorical ancestors, that arrangement would be adaptive because it allows for alertness to predators or prey at a distance.

Accommodation of the lens does not occur in emmetropia, and the lens is about 3.6 mm thick at the center; in accommodation, it thickens to about 4.5 mm. A relatively thin lens and relatively dilated pupil are also associated. The lens usually stiffens with age, causing less ability to focus when the eyes are not in a state of emmetropia.

Corrective eye surgery such as LASIK and PRK aims to correct anemmetropic vision. This is accomplished by ensuring the curvature of the cornea, the shape of the lens and their distances from each other and the retina are in harmony. By shaping the cornea, emmetropic vision can be achieved without corrective lenses. The correction for only emmetropic vision is often the reason that patients are advised to keep wearing glasses to read as they age because of presbyopia.

== Emmetropization ==
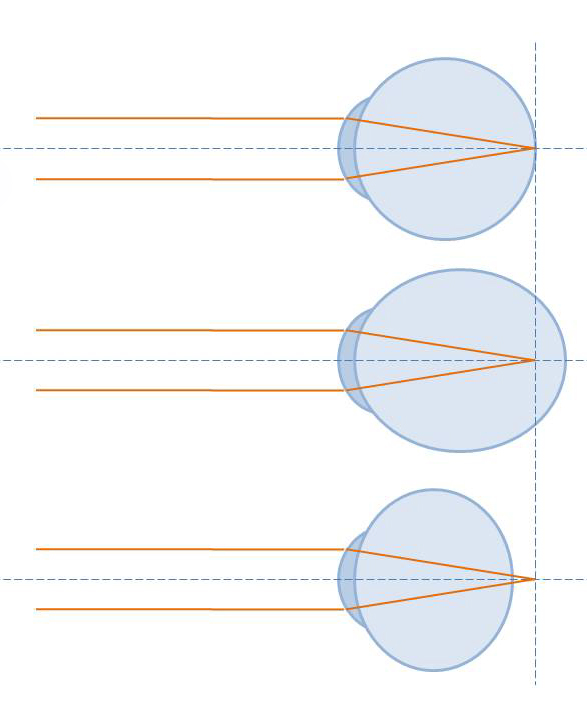
Eyeball lengths: emmetropic, near-sighted (myopic) and far-sighted (hyperopic)

The development of an eye towards emmetropia is known as emmetropization. This process is guided by visual input, and the mechanisms that coordinate this process are not fully understood. It is assumed that emmetropization occurs via an active mechanism by which defocus drives growth of the eye and that genetic factors and emmetropization both influence the growth of the eye's axis. Newborns are typically hypermetropic and then undergo a myopic shift to become emmetropic.

There has been some research on causal factors involved in the development of myopia and of hyperopia. In particular, prolonged near work is correlated with the development of myopia. Furthermore, outdoor activity has been found to have a protective effect on myopia development in children. It has long been assumed that wearing corrective spectacles might possibly perturb the process of emmetropization in young children, with this assumption being supported in particular also by animal studies. However, undercorrection of myopia in humans has been shown to increase the rate of myopic progression. However, it is not yet fully understood for which patient groups, if any, the wearing of corrective spectacles in childhood actually impedes emmetropization.

In hyperopic children, yet more factors are to be considered: Hyperopia is known to be a significant risk factor for esotropia, therefore undercorrection may have the side effect of increasing this risk. There is widespread consensus that undercorrection is counterindicated for children with accommodative esotropia. It is still unclear for which hyperopic, non-strabismic children corrective spectacles may translate to a lower strabismus risk. There are indications that emmetropization is relevant for hyperopic children who have at most about 3.0 diopters, whereas children with stronger hyperopia seem to not change their refraction independently of whether the refractive error is corrected or not.

A Cochrane Review of three trials seeking to determine whether spectacle correction reduced the occurrence of strabismus in children included one study which suggested that spectacle correction perturbed emmetropization in children, while a second study reported no differences.

== Etymology ==
"Emmetropia" is derived from Greek ἔμμετρος emmetros "well-proportioned" (from ἐν en "in" and μέτρον metron "measure") and ὤψ ōps "sight" (GEN ὠπός ōpos). Translated literally, the term indicates the condition of an eye's having in itself (i.e., without recourse to corrective lenses or other instruments) the capability to obtain an accurate measurement of an object's physical appearance.
