= Near visual acuity =

Clarity of near objects or letters

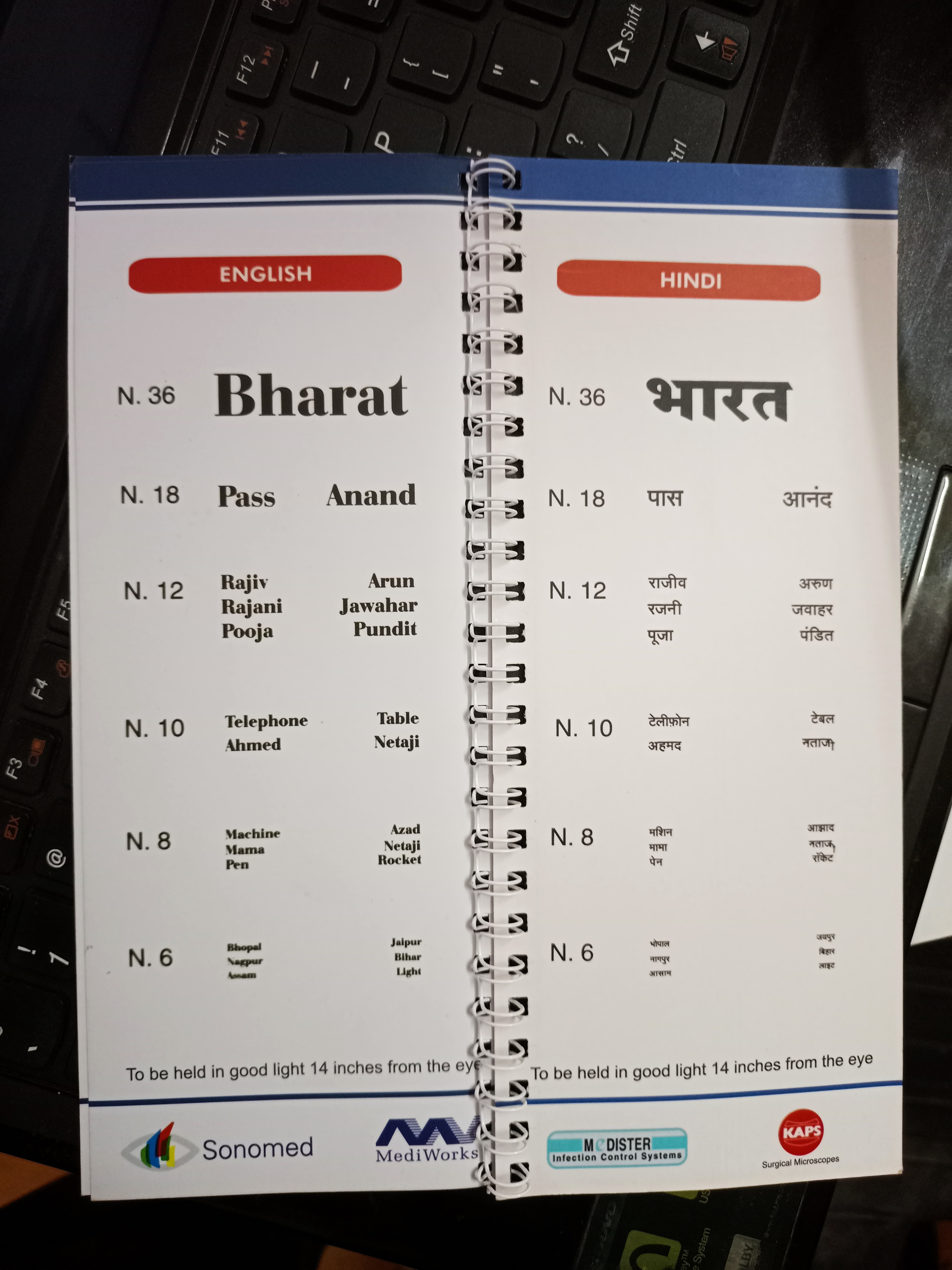
- N notation reading chart in English and Hindi languages

Near visual acuity or near vision is a measure of how clearly a person can see nearby small objects or letters. Visual acuity in general usually refers clarity of distance vision, and is measured using eye charts like Snellen chart, LogMAR chart etc. Near vision is usually measured and recorded using a printed hand-held card containing different sized paragraphs, words, letters or symbols. Jaeger chart, N notation reading chart and Snellen's near vision test are the commonly used charts for measuring and recording near visual acuity. Near vision testing is usually done after correcting visual acuity at a distance.

Eye conditions like presbyopia, accommodative insufficiency, cycloplegia etc. can affect the near visual acuity. According to the World Health Organization, the near visual acuity less than N6 or M0.8 at 40 cm is classified as near visual impairment.

== Physiology of near vision ==
Duane's classical curves showing the amplitude or width of accommodation as changing with age. Mean (B) and approximate lower (A) and upper (C) standard deviations are shown.

In human, near vision is obtained by a mechanism called accommodation. With the help of accommodation, a normal young human eye can change focus from distance (infinity) to as near as 6.5 cm from the eye. This change in focal power of the eye of approximately 15 diopters (the reciprocal of focal length in meters) occurs as a consequence of a reduction in zonular tension induced by ciliary muscle contraction. This process can occur in as little as 224 ± 30 milliseconds in bright light.

The amplitude of accommodation declines with age. The dependency of accommodation amplitude on age is graphically summarized by Duane's classical curves.

== Near vision impairment ==
The difficulty in reading small prints or blurring at a reading distance is commonly defined as Near vision impairment (NVI). Difficulty with near vision increases with age. Eye conditions like presbyopia, accommodative insufficiency, cycloplegia etc. can affect the near visual acuity. Ocular diseases that cause defective distance vision like cataract and macular degeneration, can also cause reduced near vision.

According to the World Health Organization, the near visual acuity less than N6 or M0.8 at 40 cm is classified as near visual impairment.

=== Presbyopia ===
Presbyopia is physiological insufficiency of accommodation associated with the aging of the eye that results in defective near vision. Management of presbyopia includes corrective glasses such as a special pair of reading glasses, contact lenses, bifocals, or progressive lenses.

=== Insufficiency of accommodation ===
Insufficiency of accommodative ability of the eye, known as accommodative insufficiency, is another condition that causes blurring of the near vision. Management of accommodative insufficiency needs correcting any underlying refractive errors. Vision therapy may also help improve the condition.

=== Cycloplegia ===
Cycloplegia is the paralysis of the ciliary muscle causing paralysis of accommodation and defective near vision. Cycloplegia can be caused intentionally by instilling some medications into the eyes, or it can occur due to some neurological disorders, or trauma to the eye.

=== Hypermetropia ===
Hypermetropia, the most common refractive error in childhood, affects the near vision more than distant vision.

== Tests for near vision ==
To measure near vision, a patient is seated in a well illuminated room is asked to read the handheld near vision chart kept at a distance of 25–35 cm away from the eye. The distance used for near vision testing may vary depending on the occupation or basic need of the patient. The smallest test type that the patient can read is the measure of his near acuity.

=== Jaeger chart ===
The Jaeger chart is a card on which paragraphs of text are printed, with the text sizes increasing from 0.37 mm to 2.5 mm. This card is to be held by a patient at a fixed distance from the eye dependent on the J size being read. The smallest print that the patient can read determines their near visual acuity.

=== Roman test types ===
Roman test types also known as N notation reading charts or Point chart, uses Times New Roman font, and records near visual acuity as N5, N6, N8, N10, etc. N notation is the standard near vision test in the United Kingdom and Australia.

=== M-scale notation ===
The M-scale indicate the distance in metres at which the height of a lower case 'x' letter subtends a visual angle of 5 minutes of arc at the nodal point of the eye. The M system is said to have sufficient advantages over other systems for near vision testing to make it a universally accepted standard method. M-scale notation is widely used in North America.

=== Snellen's near vision test ===
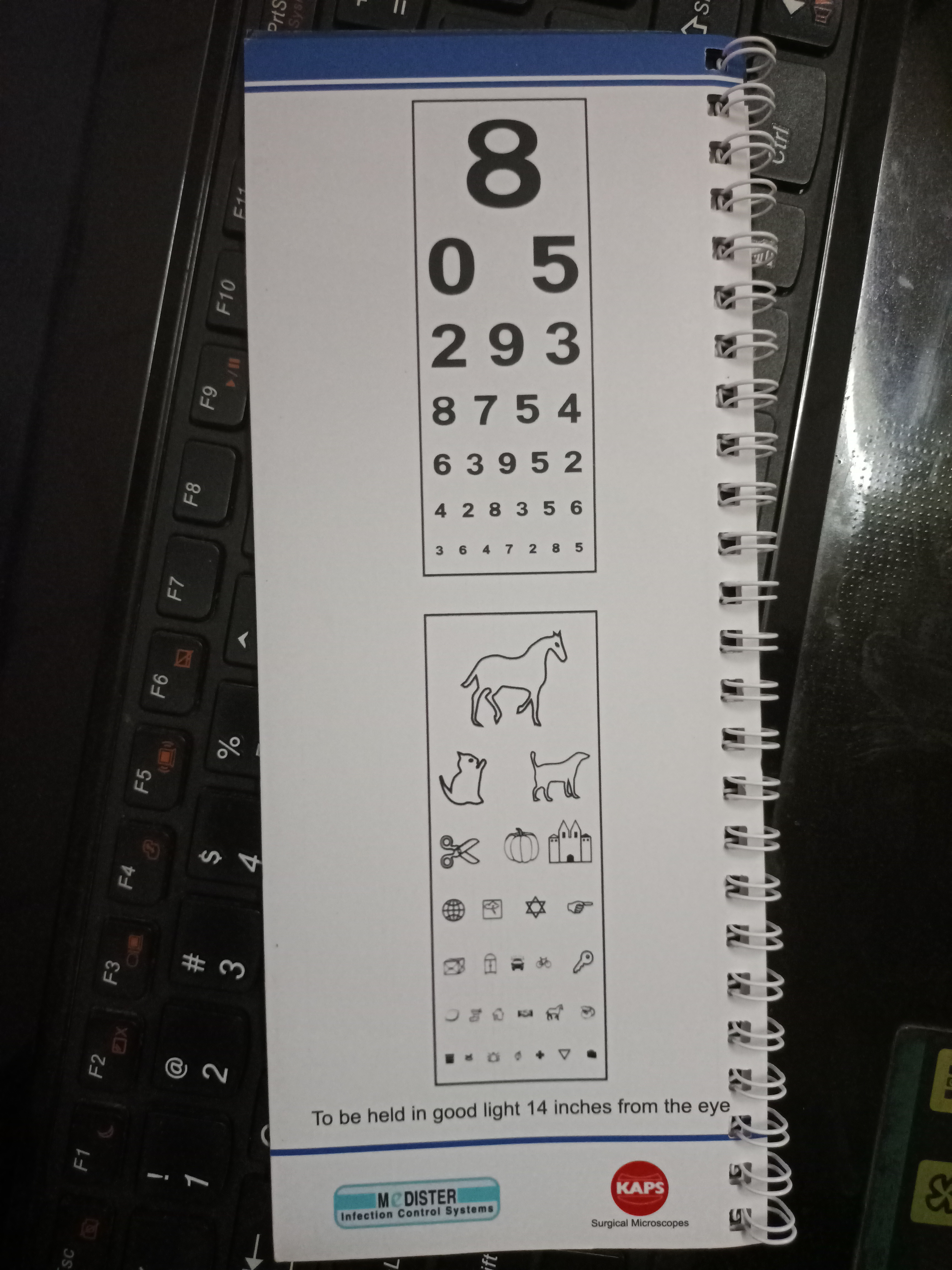
Snellens near vision chart

Snellen's near vision test is a near vision chart introduced by Dutch ophthalmologist Herman Snellen, which uses the same principle of his distance vision Snellen chart. Size of Snellen's near vision chart is approximately 1/17th of the normal Snellen chart.

=== Sloan Reading Cards ===
Sloan reading cards which uses continuous text paragraphs with logarithmic progression of optotype sizes, was a reading chart introduced in 1960s. Near acuity was recorded as 1.0 M, 1.5 M, 2.0 M etc.

=== Bailey-Lovie Word Reading Charts ===
Bailey-Lovie charts introduced in 1980s, which measures reading acuity and reading speed, uses logarithmic progression of optotype sizes.

=== MNREAD acuity chart ===
The MNREAD acuity chart is a text based chart used to measure near visual acuity in people with normal or low vision. It can also be used to measure maximum reading speed, critical print size and the reading accessibility index of a person. Digital and printed types of charts are available.

=== Lea near vision card ===
It is a type of Lea chart used to assess the functional near vision in children. It is also used to introduce the child to the testing procedure, before introducing a distance Lea chart.

== Standardization of reading charts ==
The concept of logarithmic progression of optotype sizes for distance vision charts was introduced by John Green, in 1868. However, apart from the reading chart developed by Birkhaeuser in 1911, none of the charts in use at the time were standardized. Aiming to overcome the standardization problem of Jaeger charts, N-notation was introduced in 1950s, but this too was not fully logarithmic. This was followed by the introduction of logarithmic Sloan reading cards in the early 1960s and then the Bailey-Lowey word reading charts in the 1980s.

Standardization criteria established by the International Council of Ophthalmology (ICO) or EN ISO 8596 directive include the reproducibility, comparability, validity, interpretability and reliability of reading tests. Reading charts which uses a logarithmic progression of print sizes, like Sloan Reading Cards, the Bailey-Lovie Word Reading Charts, the MNREAD charts, the RADNER Reading Charts, the Colenbrander Continuous Text Near Vision Cards, the Smith-Kettlewell Reading Test, the Oculus Reading Probe II, the C-Read Charts and the Arabic-BAL Chart etc. are near vision charts that meet standardization criteria published by the ICO.

== Conversion ==
Near visual acuity conversion chart
Roman	Jaeger	Snellen (US)	Snellen (Metric)	Decimal	M unit
N4.5	J1	20/20	6/6	1.00	0.5
N5	J3	20/30	6/9	0.67	0.8
N6	J5	20/40	6/12	0.50	1.0
N8	J6	20/50	6/15	0.40	-
N10	J7	20/60	6/18	0.33	1.2
N12	J9	20/80	6/24	0.25	-
N14	J10	20/100	6/30	0.20	1.3
