= Louis de Wecker =

French ophthalmologist (1832–1906)

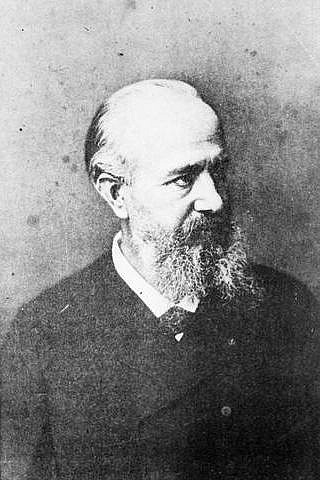
Louis de Wecker (ca. 1890)

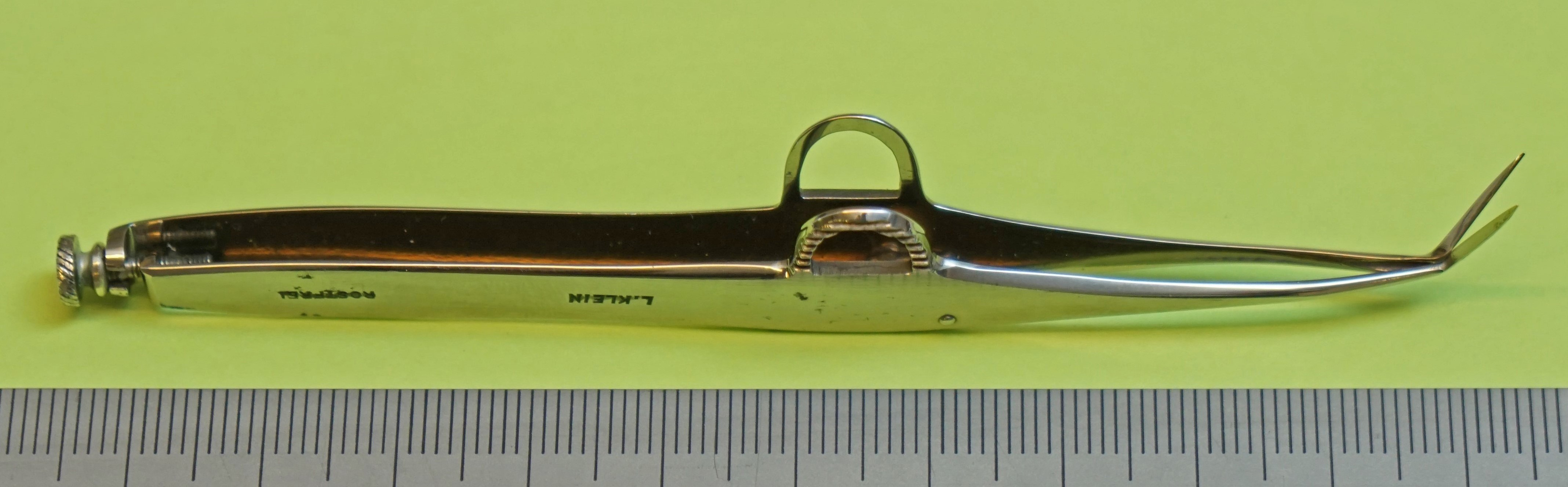
de Wecker scissors

Louis de Wecker (29 September 1832 – 24 January 1906) was a French ophthalmologist born in Frankfurt am Main, Germany.

He studied medicine in Würzburg, Berlin, Vienna and Paris, earning doctorates from Würzburg (1855) and Paris (1861). From 1862 he maintained a popular ophthalmology clinic in Paris.

In 1867 he performed an enucleation of the eye of Léon Gambetta. His name is associated with "de Wecker scissors", which are small sharp-pointed scissors used for intraocular surgery of the iris and lens capsule.

Dr. José Rizal (1861-1896), martyr and national hero of the Philippines, completed his ophthalmological training under Professor Louis de Wecker in Paris in 1885.

== Selected writings ==
- Traité des maladies du fond de l'oeil et Atlas d'ophthalmoscopie, 1870 with Eduard Jäger von Jaxtthal; (Treatise on maladies of the fundus of the eye and an atlas of ophthalmoscopy).
- De l'iridotomie, 1873 (Iridotomy).
- Échelle métrique pour mesurer l'acuité visuelle, 1877 (Metric scale to measure visual acuity).
- Traité complet d'ophthalmologie, with Edmond Landolt (Comprehensive treatise of ophthalmology).
- "Ocular therapeutics"; translated into English in 1879.
- Traité theorique et pratique des maladies des yeux (Theoretical and practical treatise on maladies of the eye).
- Ophtalmoscopie clinique, 1881 (Clinical ophthalmoscopy).
