= Landolt =

Landolt is a Swiss surname. It may refer to:

== People ==
- Arlo U. Landolt (1935-2022), American astronomer
- Dennis Landolt (born 1986), American footballer
- Edmund Landolt (1846–1926), Swiss ophthalmologist who developed "Landolt C"
- Elias Landolt (1926–2013), Swiss botanist
- Hans Heinrich Landolt (1831–1910), Swiss chemist who discovered iodine clock reaction, also one of the founders of Landolt-Börnstein database
- Jaqueline Landolt, Swiss curler, European champion
- Kevin Landolt (born 1975), American footballer
- Richard B. Landolt, American admiral
- Salomon Landolt (1741–1818), Swiss officer, bailiff, agriculturist, and painter

== Other ==
- Landolt–Börnstein, systematic data collection in physical sciences and engineering
- Landolt C, optotype developed by ophthalmologist Edmund Landolt
- Landolt & Cie, Swiss bank
- 15072 Landolt, asteroid, named after Arlo U. Landolt
- Mount Landolt, mountain in Antarctica, named after Arlo U. Landolt
