= Eduard Jäger von Jaxtthal =

Austrian ophthalmologist

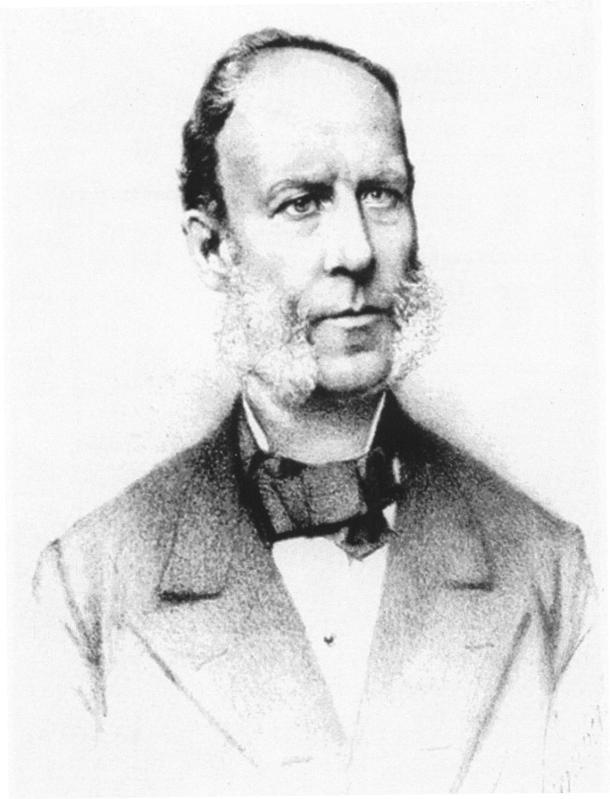
Eduard Jäger von Jaxtthal (1818-1884)

Eduard Jäger von Jaxtthal (25 June 1818 in Vienna – 5 July 1884 in Vienna) was an Austrian ophthalmologist who was a native of Vienna. He was a professor at the University of Vienna, and was son to oculist Friedrich Jäger von Jaxtthal (1784-1871), and grandson to Georg Joseph Beer (1763-1821).

Jäger is remembered for his work involving eye operations, and for his research of ophthalmic disorders. He was an early practitioner of the ophthalmoscope, and was among the first to use ophthalmoscopy to determine refractive error in the eye. Also, he is credited with providing the first description of retinal appearances associated with diabetes.

In the 1850s Jäger made improvements to eye chart test types that were earlier developed by Heinrich Küchler (1811-1873). In 1862 Dutch ophthalmologist Hermann Snellen introduced the popular "Snellen chart" for testing visual acuity.

== Selected writings ==
- Beiträge zur Pathologie des Auges (Contributions to the pathology of the eye); Wien: Staatsdruckerei, 1855.
- Ergebnisse der Untersuchung des menschlichen Auges mit dem Augenspiegel (Results of the investigation of the human eye with the ophthalmoscope); Wien: Staatsdr. 1855.
- Ophthalmoskopischer Hand-Atlas (Ophthalmoscopic hand atlas); Wien, Hofdruckerei 1869.

== See also ==
- Jäger (disambiguation)
