= Gertrude Rand =

American research psychologist (1886-1970)

- Born: Marie Gertrude Rand; October 29, 1886; Brooklyn, New York
- Died: June 30, 1970 (aged 83); Stony Brook, New York
- Education: Cornell (BA); Bryn Mawr (MA, PhD)
- Spouse: Clarence E. Ferree (m. 1918; died 1943)
- Scientific career
- Fields: Color perception
- Workplaces: Bryn Mawr; Johns Hopkins; Columbia
- Thesis: The factors that influence the sensitivity of the retina to color: A quantitative study and methods of standardizing (1911)
- Doctoral advisor: Clarence E. Ferree

Marie Gertrude Rand Ferree (October 29, 1886 – June 30, 1970) was an American research scientist who is known for her extensive body of work about color perception. Her work included "mapping the retina for its perceptional abilities", "developing new instruments and lamps for ophthalmologists", and "detection and measurement of color blindness". Rand, with LeGrand H. Hardy and M. Catherine Rittler, developed the HRR pseudoisochromatic color test.

While working at Wilmer Ophthalmological Institute of Johns Hopkins University School of Medicine, she acquired patents for lighting devices and instruments, and worked on the lighting of the Holland Tunnel between New York and New Jersey. In 1912, Rand received the Sarah Berliner Research Fellowship from the Association of Collegiate Alumnae which became the American Association of University Women. She was the first female fellow of the Illuminating Engineering Society and received a Gold Medal award from that society in 1963. Gertrude became member number 159, the second woman member of Optica (formerly The Optical Society (OSA)). In 1959, Rand joined Christine Ladd-Franklin, Charlotte Moore Sitterly, Dorothy Nickerson, Louise L Sloan, and Mary E Warga as the five women part of the first Optica Fellow class.

and was one of only five women members of the first Optica Fellow class. In 1959, she became the first woman to receive the Optical Society of America's Edgar D. Tillyer Medal.

== Early life and education ==
Rand was born on October 29, 1886, in Brooklyn, New York. Her father, Lyman Fiske Rand, was the manager of a manufacturing company. Rand graduated from the Educated Girls High School in Brooklyn in 1904 and received her undergraduate B.A. degree in experimental psychology from Cornell University in 1908. She went on to receive her MA and PhD in psychology in 1911 from Bryn Mawr College. Her dissertation, under the supervision of the experimental psychologist Clarence E. Ferree, was titled “The factors that influence the sensitivity of the retina to color: A quantitative study and methods of standardizing.”

Rand married her former supervisor, Ferree, in 1918, but retained her maiden name professionally. They worked together until his death in 1943.

== Career and research ==
After receiving her degree, Rand continued at Bryn Mawr as a postdoctoral fellow. In 1912, she became a Sarah Berliner Research Fellow from the Associate of Collegiate Alumni, now the American Association of University Women. From 1913 till 1927, she worked in experimental psychology at Bryn Mawr, where she was a professor and researcher. At Bryn Mawr, Rand's research focused on developing techniques for measuring the light sensitivity and color discrimination of different parts of the retina. She and her husband Ferree created a map of the retina known as the Ferree-Rand perimeter.

From 1924 to 1927, Rand served on the National Research Council's Committee on Industrial Lighting.

In 1928, she left Bryn Mawr to join work for the Wilmer Ophthalmological Institute of Johns Hopkins School of Medicine in Baltimore, Maryland. There, she taught as an associate professor, first research ophthalmology and later physiological optics. Together with her husband Ferree, she developed a vision research laboratory. She became the Director of the Research Laboratory of Physiological Optics in 1935. At Johns Hopkins, Rand took on many projects, many involving industrial lighting.

Upon her husband's death in 1943, Rand moved to New York City as a research associate at Columbia University’s Knapp Foundation of the College of Physicians and Surgeons. She retired in 1957. Along with collaborators Legrand Hardy and M. Catherine Rittler, she researched the detection and assessment of color blindness and developed the Hardy-Rand-Rittler plate, known as the HRR pseudo-isochromatic color blindness test.

== Awards and recognition ==
Rand was the first female fellow of the Illuminating Society of North America in 1952 and received a gold medal from them in 1963. Rand was a member of the American Psychological Association and the American Association for the Advancement of Science. She authored and co-authored over one hundred research papers in her career.

She received the Optical Society’s Edgar D. Tillyer Medal in 1959, the first woman to do so. Rand was also a member of the first class of OSA Fellows in 1959, one of only five of the 115 members included in this first class.

== Death ==
Rand died on 30 June 1970.
