= E chart =

Ophthalmological chart

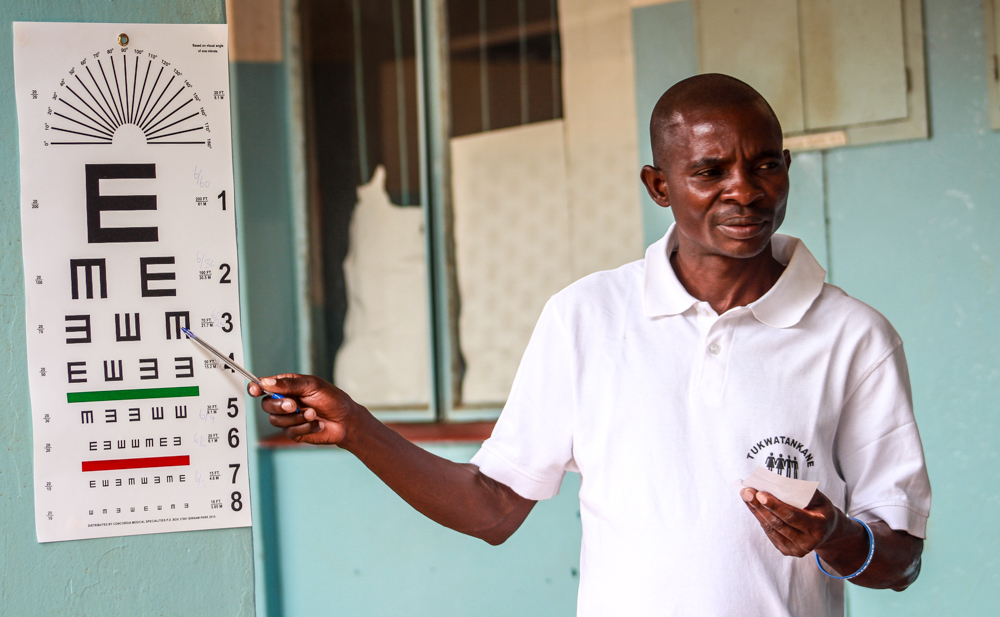
Eye specialist carrying out eye examination on a patient at a district hospital in Zambia

An E chart, also known as a tumbling E chart, is an eye chart used to measure a patient's visual acuity.

== Uses ==
This chart does not depend on a patient's easy familiarity with a particular writing system (such as the Latin alphabet). This is often desirable, for instance with very young children. This also allows use with patients not readily fluent in the alphabet – for example, in China.

The chart contains rows of the letter "E" in various kinds of rotation. The patient is asked to state (usually by pointing) where the limbs of the E are pointing, "up, down, left or right." Depending on how far the patient can "read", their visual acuity is quantified. It works on the same principle as Snellen's distant vision chart.

== See also ==
- Visual acuity
- Landolt C
