= Lea test =

Eye chart designed for children

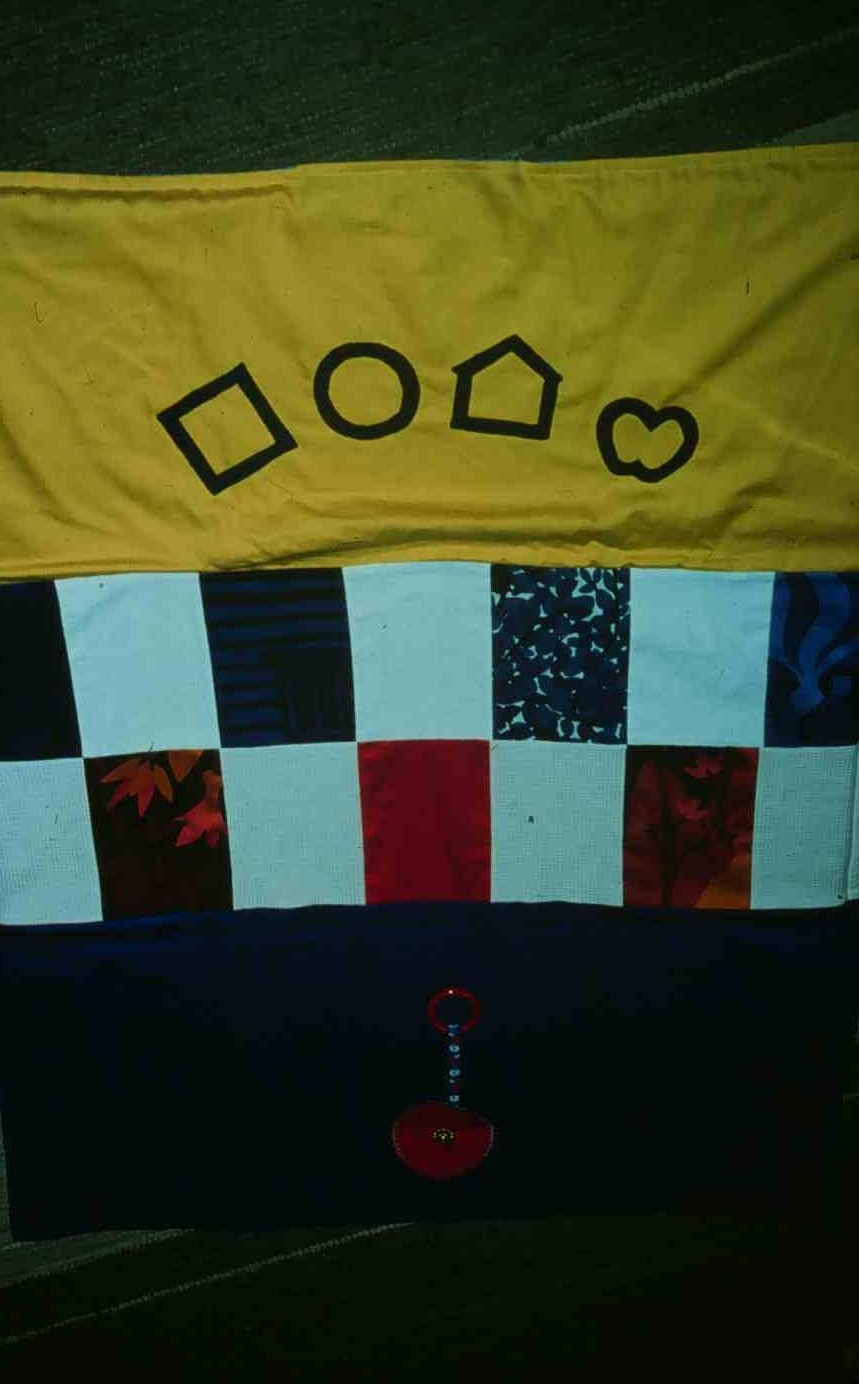
An example of one version of the LEA Symbols Test. In this picture, the test's four optotypes are displayed on a blanket to be used to diagnose the visual acuity of a young child. Photo courtesy of Dr. Lea Hyvarinen & Lea-Test http://www.lea-test.fi

The LEA Vision Test System is a series of pediatric vision tests designed specifically for children who do not know how to read the letters of the alphabet that are typically used in eye charts. There are numerous variants of the LEA test which can be used to assess the visual capabilities of near vision and distance vision, as well as several other aspects of occupational health, such as contrast sensitivity, visual field, color vision, visual adaptation, motion perception, and ocular function and accommodation (eye).

== History ==
The first version of the LEA test was developed in 1976 by Finnish pediatric ophthalmologist Lea Hyvärinen, MD, PhD. Dr. Hyvärinen completed her thesis on fluorescein angiography and helped start the first clinical laboratory in that area while serving as a fellow at the Wilmer Eye Institute of Johns Hopkins Hospital in 1967. During her time with the Wilmer Institute, she became interested in vision rehabilitation and assessment and has been working in that field since the 1970s, training rehabilitation teams, designing new visual assessment devices, and teaching. The first test within the LEA Vision Test System that Dr. Hyvarinen created was the classic LEA Symbols Test followed shortly by the LEA Numbers Test which was used in comparison studies within the field of occupational medicine.

== Accuracy ==
Among the array of visual assessment picture tests that exist, the LEA symbols tests are the only tests that have been calibrated against the standardized Landolt C vision test symbol. The Landolt C is an optotype that is used throughout most of the world as the standardized symbol for measuring visual acuity. It is identical to the "C" that is used in the traditional Snellen chart.

In addition to this, the LEA symbols test has been experimentally verified to be both a valid and reliable measure of visual acuity. As is desirable of a good vision test, each of the four optotypes used in the symbols test has been proven to measure visual acuity similarly and blur equally as well, supporting the test's internal consistency.

A study published in Acta Ophthalmologica Scandinavica in 2006 showed that the Lea Symbols 15-line folding distance chart is clinically useful in detecting deficiencies in visual acuity in preschool children. The study, which compared visual acuity diagnoses from Lea symbols tests to those obtained via ophthalmological examination, revealed that the Lea symbols chart provided an accurate and sufficient assessment in 95.9% of the 149 preschool-age children tested. This suggests that Lea tests can be used confidently as an alternative to more costly and time-consuming pediatric tests of visual acuity.

== Importance ==
The unique design of the LEA tests and their special optotypes allow for pediatric low vision to be diagnosed in children at much younger ages than standard vision tests allow. This is especially important in young children who possess other physical disabilities or mental disabilities and are entitled to receive early special education benefits. More than half of children who suffer from low vision also have other impairments or disabilities. Most of the LEA tests can also be used on children with significant brain damage and serve as one of the few methods that can accurately assess visual acuity in these situations.

== Versions ==
The LEA Vision Test System currently contains over 40 different tests which target the assessment of many aspects of vision and communication deficiencies in both children and adults.

=== LEA Symbols Test ===
The oldest and most basic form of the LEA test is simply referred to as the "LEA Symbols Test". This test consists of four optotypes (test symbols): the outlines of an apple, a pentagon, a square, and a circle. Because these four symbols can be named and easily identified as everyday, concrete objects ("apple", "house", "window", and "ring"), they can be recognized at an earlier age than abstract letters or numbers can be. This enables preschool children to be tested for visual acuity long before they become familiar with the letter and numbers used in other standard vision charts.

The LEA Symbols Test is often used in the form of the three-dimensional (3-D) LEA Puzzle. This puzzle incorporates color along with the four standard optotypes to allow for measurement of visual acuity in children as young as fourteen months of age.

=== LEA Numbers Test ===
The "LEA Numbers Test" was the second of the LEA tests that was developed and can be used to test the visual acuity of older children and even adults. This test has a layout similar to a typical Snellen chart, with lines of numbers decreasing in size towards the bottom of the page. Like the optotypes of the LEA Symbols Test, these numbers are also calibrated against the Landolt C and blur equally.

=== LEA Grating Acuity Test ===
This test allows for the assessment of grating acuity, especially in children who possess severe or multiple visual deficiencies. The "LEA Gratings Test" has also been shown to be successful in vision testing of children with brain damage and is the only test that can reveal their limited capacity for the processing of large numbers of parallel lines.

=== LEA Contrast Sensitivity Test ===
Visual information that is presented in low contrast settings is very important to the process of visual communication. It is especially vital to assess a child's contrast sensitivity at a young age in order to determine the distance and accuracy with the child can distinguish facial features. A very popular test designed specifically for this reason is the "Hiding Heidi Low Contrast Face Pictures" test (which the LEA Vision Test System produces a version of.) This test uses a series of cards depicting cartoon faces of different contrast levels. The contrast sensitivity assessment obtained from this test is very important in educational settings because children with contrast deficiencies have extreme difficulty receiving visual cues from body language or facial expressions and often can't read the blackboard or projector.

== See also ==
- Eye chart
- Sloan letters
- Snellen chart
- Pediatric ophthalmology
- Infant vision
- Visual acuity testing in children
