= Edmund Landolt =

Swiss ophthalmologist (1846–1926)

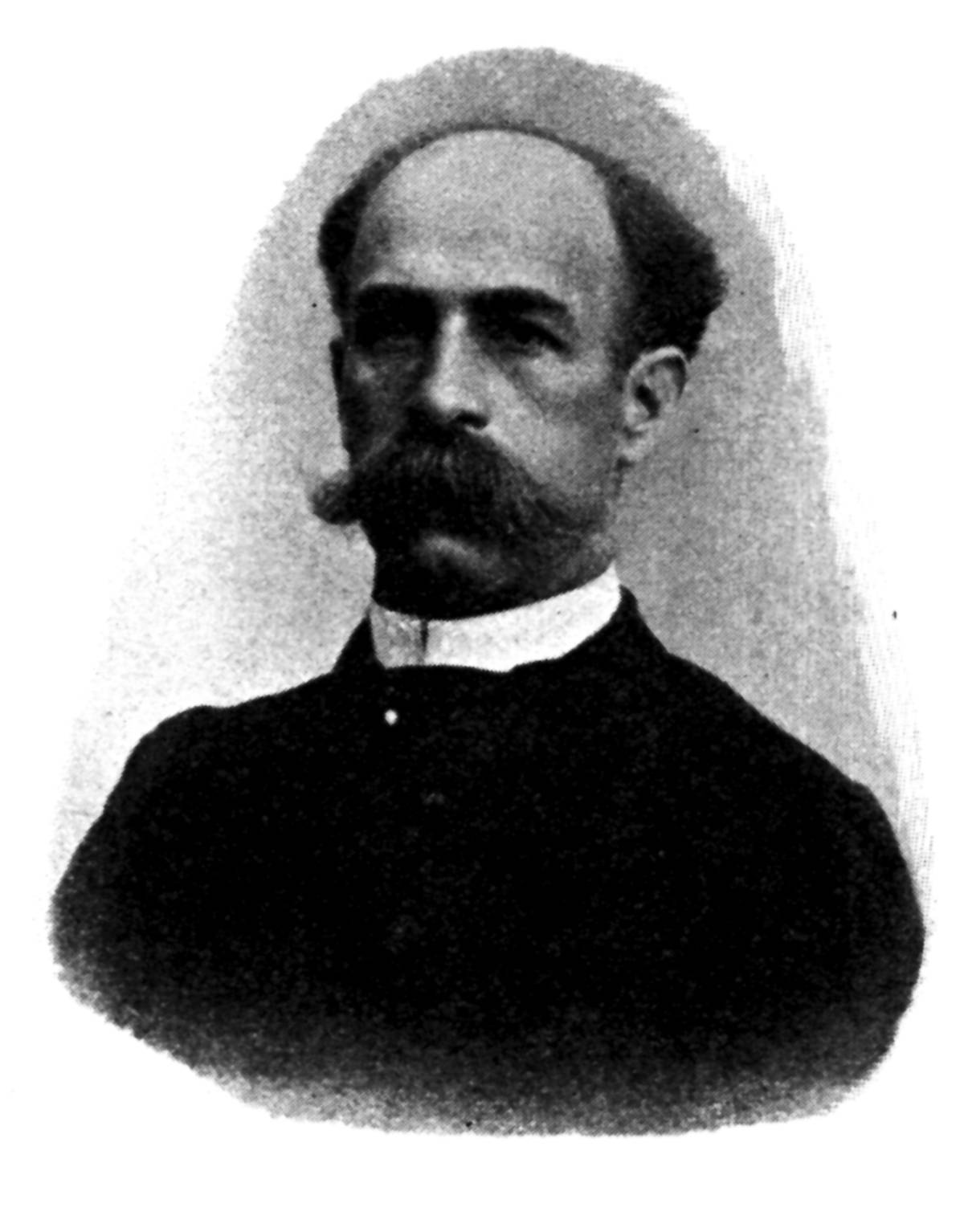
- Born: 17 May 1846; Kirchberg, Switzerland
- Died: 9 May 1926 (aged 79); Paris, France
- Scientific career
- Fields: Ophthalmology
- Workplaces: Institut National des Jeunes Aveugles

Jacques Rodolphe Edmund Landolt (17 May 1846 – 9 May 1926) was a Swiss ophthalmologist stationed in Paris, mostly known for a wide range of publications and his research in the field of ophthalmology.

== First years ==
Edmund Landolt was born in Kirchberg, Switzerland, of a French mother, Rosina Baumgartner, and Swiss father, Rudolf Landolt.

He came to France during the war in 1871 with a Swiss ambulance hospital, and was present at the battles around Belfort, where he contracted enteric fever.

== Study and work ==
Studied at University of Zurich where he got a Ph.D. in 1869 and was through this time and later pupil of Knapp in Heidelberg, Ferdinand Arlt in Vienna, Von Graefe and Helmholtz in Berlin, Horner in Zürich, and Snellen and Donders in Utrecht.

Worked in physiological optics with, among others, Snellen and Donders.

After study and practice in Utrecht and Germany he established himself in Paris in 1874 where he became oculist to the Institut National des Jeunes Aveugles.

With Panas (1832–1903) and Poncet (1849–1913) he re-founded the Archives d'ophtalmologie in 1881 and co-directed the Laboratoire d’Ophtalmologie with Javal.

Landolt's eye clinic on the Rue Saint-André-des-Arts was world-famous. There he treated, among others, Mary Cassatt, and gave her a diagnosis of cataracts.

== Special fields of work ==
Ocular muscles and their disorders. Pioneering the work in their study and treatment.

He discovered “Landolt's bodies” between the rods and cones of the outer nuclear layer of the retina, investigated the functions of the ocular muscles and devised a new advancement operation.

Famous for his publication of Landolt C.

== Publications ==
=== English ===
- The introduction of the metrical system into ophthalmology, London : J. & A. Churchill, 1876. OCLC 56373123
- The artificial eye, London : Trübner & Co., 1879. OCLC 29693518
  - tr. Edgar Athelstane Browne
- A manual of examination of the eyes. A course of lectures delivered at the "Ećole pratique,", Philadelphia, D. G. Brinton, 1879. OCLC 2394443
  - tr. Swan M Burnett
- A manual of examination of the eyes. A course of lectures delivered at the "École pratique,", Philadelphia, D. G. Brinton, 1879. OCLC 4069016
  - Ed. 2.: London : Baillie're, Tindall & Cox, 1879. OCLC 14408212
- On myopia, London : Harrison and Sons, 1879. OCLC 29693435
- On insufficiency of the power of convergence, [S.l. : [s.n.], 1886. OCLC 29693375
- The refraction and accommodation of the eye and their anomalies, Edinburgh, Pentland, 1886. OCLC 3057956
  - Ed. 2.: Phila., J. B. Lippincott Company., 1886. OCLC 12013230
  - Refraction and accommodation of the eye and their anomalies, Edinburgh, Young J. Pentland, 1886. OCLC 11626601
- Cataract-operation, in our time, [Chicago] : Ophthalmic Record, 1892. OCLC 27659117
- Vade mecum of ophthalmological therapeutics, Philadelphia, J. B. Lippincott Company, 1898. OCLC 9689831
  - and Gygax
- On ophthalmic surgery, being the Bowman lecture delivered on Wednesday, June 7, 1911., Lond. 1911. OCLC 83292691
- Defective ocular movements and their diagnosis, London, Frowde, 1913. OCLC 14798829
  - and Marc Landolt

=== French ===
- Le grossissement des images ophthalmoscopiques, Paris : Adrien Delahaye, 1874. OCLC: 16077174
- Sur les causes de l'amétropie, Paris, 1877. OCLC: 79211659
- Leçons sur le diagnostic des maladies des yeux : faite à l'Ecole pratique de la Faculté de médicine de Paris, pendant le semester d'été 1875, Paris : Aux Bureaux du Progrès Médical : Ve A. Delahaye, 1877. OCLC: 16867948
- L'œil artificiel, Paris : Octave Doin, 1878. OCLC: 65009615
- Manuel d'ophthalmoscopie., Paris, Doin, 1878. OCLC: 14863824
- Clinique des maladies des yeux. Compte rendu pour l'anneé 1878, Coulommiers : P. Brodard, 1879. OCLC: 53178656
- Traité complet d'ophthalmologie, Paris : V. Adrien Delahaye, 1880-1889. OCLC: 9766547
  - and Louis de Wecker.
  - Ed. 2.: Paris, Lecrosnier et Babé, 1880-89. OCLC: 14860559
- Tableau synoptique des mouvements des yeux & de leurs anomalies, Paris : Martinet, [ca.1880] OCLC: 67734772
- Tableau synoptique des mouvements des yeux et de leurs anomalies, [S.l. : s.n., 188-?]. OCLC: 61653001
  - aa. Librairie médicale scientifique vigot frères,
- Notice biographique à la mémoire du Docteur C [Johann] F[riedrich] Horner, professeur d'ophthalmologie à l'Université de Zurich, Paris : [s.n.], 1887. OCLC: 81850385
  - and C Johann Friedrich Horner
- Notice biographique à la mémoire du Docteur T.F. Horner, professeur d'ophthalmologie à l'Université de Zurich, Paris, 1887. OCLC: 82939545
- Rapport sur la question du strabisme, preś. au VIIe Congreś international d'ophthalmologie à Heidelberg, Wiesbaden, 1888. OCLC: 67724682
- Opto-types simples. 2 circular disks, Paris : O. Doin, 1889. OCLC: 53178663
- F. C. Donders, Paris : Steinheil, 1889. OCLC: 69060626
- Un nouveau procédé d'opération dans le distichiasis, Paris, 1890. OCLC: 67724675
- Un nouveau cas d'achromatopsie totale, Paris : G. Steinheil, 1891. OCLC: 53178653
- H. de Helmholtz : esquisse biographique, [S.l. : s.n.], 1894. OCLC: 65101525
  - and H. de Helmholtz
- Précis de thérapeutique ophtalmologique, Paris, Masson, 1895. OCLC: 14808861
  - and Gygax
- Nouveaux objets-types pour la de\´{t}ermination de lacute visuelle, Paris : Doin, 1899. OCLC: 65087355
- Nouveau objets-types pour la détermination de l'acuité visuelle., Paris : O. Doin, 1899. OCLC: 53178619
- Souvenirs sur H.Snellen, Paris : Steinheil, 1908. OCLC: 67520817
- Diagnostic des troubles de la motilité oculaire, Paris, Masson, 1909. Ed. française par Marc Landolt OCLC: 14785955
- Examen des mouvements normaux & pathologiques des yeux, Paris, G. Steinheil, 1916. OCLC: 5856097

== Family ==
Married Valerie Hübscher. Two sons; Dr. Fernand Landolt, laryngologist and Dr. Marc Landolt, ophthalmologist.

== Curiosity ==
He is mentioned in Sherlock Holmes' book The Demon Device (Robert Saffron) p. 44.

Sir Arthur Conan Doyle spent time with him in Paris in relation to his study in ophthalmology in Vienna.
