= Heinrich Küchler =

German ophthalmologist (1811–1873)

Heinrich Georg Küchler (23 April 1811 – 29 March 1873) was a German ophthalmologist.

== Biography ==
Küchler was born and raised in Darmstadt, Germany. From 1828 he studied medicine at the University of Giessen, and after graduation, visited Paris for study. In 1834 he returned to Darmstadt, where he started a private ophthalmic practice. In 1836 he was arrested unexpectedly because of his actions in association with a Burschenschaft (fraternal organization) at Giessen. For nearly three years he was imprisoned, obtaining his freedom in January 1839. After his release, he resumed his ophthalmic practice in Darmstadt.

In 1844, in addition to his private practice, he became a physician at the Mathilden-Landeskrankenhaus, a regional hospital in Darmstadt. In 1868 he received the title of Obermedizinalrat (chief medical advisor) and during the Franco-Prussian War (1870–71), he was in charge of a Reservelazarette.

He is credited with developing about 1835 the first symbol eye chart, consisting of figures of various objects (birds, frogs, farm implements, cannons, etc.) cut from calendars and almanacs, which he glued to a sheet of paper in decreasing size. Several years later, he issued an eye chart using letters of the alphabet in a graduated series. The chart had twelve lines with the larger letters on the topmost line—also, the lines decreased in size to the bottom line. The chart was first published in 1843 and was not accepted generally at the time.

Küchler died in 1873 in Darmstadt at the age of 61.

== Selected works ==
- Eine neue operative Heilmethode der sämmtlichen wahren Hornhautstaphylome, 1853 (A new surgical method of treatment for corneal staphyloma).
- Die Doppelnaht zur Damm-Scham-Scheidennath, Erlangen, 1863 (The double-seam to the perineal-pubic-sheathing).
- Sanitätsdienst im Grossherzogthum Hessen, 1866 – (Medical service in the Grand Duchy of Hesse).
