= LogMAR chart =

Eye chart

- ETDRS Chart R, a type of logMAR chart
- Purpose: assess visual acuity

A logMAR chart is a chart consisting of rows of letters that is used by ophthalmologists, orthoptists, optometrists, and vision scientists to estimate visual acuity. The name of the chart is an abbreviation for "logarithm of the Minimum Angle of Resolution". The chart was developed at the National Vision Research Institute of Australia in 1976, and is designed to enable a more accurate estimate of acuity than do other charts (e.g., the Snellen chart). For this reason, the LogMAR chart is recommended, particularly in a research setting.

When using a LogMAR chart, visual acuity is scored with reference to the logarithm of the minimum angle of resolution, as the chart's name suggests. An observer who can resolve details as small as 1 minute of visual angle scores LogMAR 0, since the base-10 logarithm of 1 is 0; an observer who can resolve details as small as 2 minutes of visual angle (i.e., reduced acuity) scores LogMAR 0.3, since the base-10 logarithm of 2 is near-approximately 0.3; and so on.

Specific types of logMAR chart include the original Bailey-Lovie chart, as well as the ETDRS charts, developed for the Early Treatment Diabetic Retinopathy Study.

== History ==
The chart was designed by Ian Bailey and Jan E. Lovie-Kitchin at the National Vision Research Institute of Australia. They described their motivation for designing the LogMAR chart as follows: "We have designed a series of near vision charts in which the typeface, size progression, size range, number of words per row and spacings were chosen in an endeavour to achieve a standardization of the test task."

== Relation to the Snellen chart ==
Snellen chart

The Snellen chart, which dates back to 1862, is also commonly used to estimate visual acuity. A Snellen score of 6/6 (20/20), indicating that an observer can resolve details as small as 1 minute of visual angle, corresponds to a LogMAR of 0 (since the base-10 logarithm of 1 is 0); a Snellen score of 6/12 (20/40), indicating an observer can resolve details as small as 2 minutes of visual angle, corresponds to a LogMAR of 0.3 (since the base-10 logarithm of 2 is near-approximately 0.3), and so on.

== Recording visual acuity using the LogMAR chart ==
Visual acuity scales
Foot	Metre	LogMAR
20/200	6/60	1.00
20/160	6/48	0.90
20/125	6/38	0.80
20/100	6/30	0.70
20/80	6/24	0.60
20/63	6/18	0.50
20/50	6/15	0.40
20/40	6/12	0.30
20/32	6/9.5	0.20
20/25	6/7.5	0.10
20/20	6/6	0.00
20/16	6/4.8	−0.10
20/12.5	6/3.8	−0.20
20/10	6/3	−0.30

Each letter has a score value of 0.02 log units. Since there are 5 letters per line, the total score for a line on the LogMAR chart represents a change of 0.1 log units. The formula used in calculating the score is:

LogMAR VA = LogMAR value of the best line read − 0.02 × number of optotypes read

Given that each line has 5 optotypes, the equivalent formula is:

LogMAR VA = LogMAR value of the partially read line+ 0.02 × number of optotypes missed

== Advantages of LogMAR over other charts ==
The LogMAR chart is designed to enable more accurate estimates of acuity as compared to other acuity charts (e.g., the Snellen chart). Each line of the LogMAR chart comprises the same number of test letters (effectively standardizing the test across letter size); the letter size changes from one line to the next in a constant ratio, as does the spacing between lines (making the chart easy to use at nonstandard viewing distances). In ETDRS charts, the Sloan letters are used (Sloan letters are perfectly square approximately equally legible one from another), while the Bailey–Lovie chart used rectangular (5:4) letters based on the Transport typeface, as set out in British Standard 4274:1968.

Zero LogMAR indicates standard vision, positive values indicates poor vision, and negative values indicates good vision. This is less intuitive than other VA notations. However, LogMAR is actually a notation of vision loss.

== Low vision and blindness definition with LogMAR ==
The World Health Organization established criteria for low vision using the LogMAR scale. Low vision is defined as a best-corrected visual acuity worse than 0.5 LogMAR but equal or better than 1.3 LogMAR in the better eye. Blindness is defined as a best-corrected visual acuity worse than 1.3 LogMAR.
