= Golovin–Sivtsev table =

Standardized table for testing visual acuity

- Purpose: testing visual acuity

The Golovin–Sivtsev table (Russian: Таблица Головина-Сивцева, romanized: Tablitsa Golovina-Sivtseva) is a standardized table for testing visual acuity, which was developed in 1923 by Soviet ophthalmologists Sergei Golovin and D. A. Sivtsev. In the USSR, it was the most common table of its kind, and as of 2008 its use is still widespread in several post-Soviet states.

The table consists of two parts with 12 rows each, representing visual acuity values between 0.1 and 2.0. The left part consists of series of the Cyrillic letters Ш, Б, М, Н, К, Ы, and И in a definite order, and the right part of the table consists of a series of Landolt C symbols. The width of each character is equal to its height, and the contours have standard 1/5 gaps of the overall size.

The value D, indicated to the left of each row, gives the distance in meters from which a person with a visual acuity of 1.0 can read the corresponding row. The value V, indicated to the right, gives the minimum visual acuity needed to read the row from a distance of 5 meters. The first row contains symbols 70 mm in size (V = 0.1); the second row, 35 mm; the bottom third row, 7 mm (V = 1.0); the bottom row, 3.5 mm (V = 2.0).

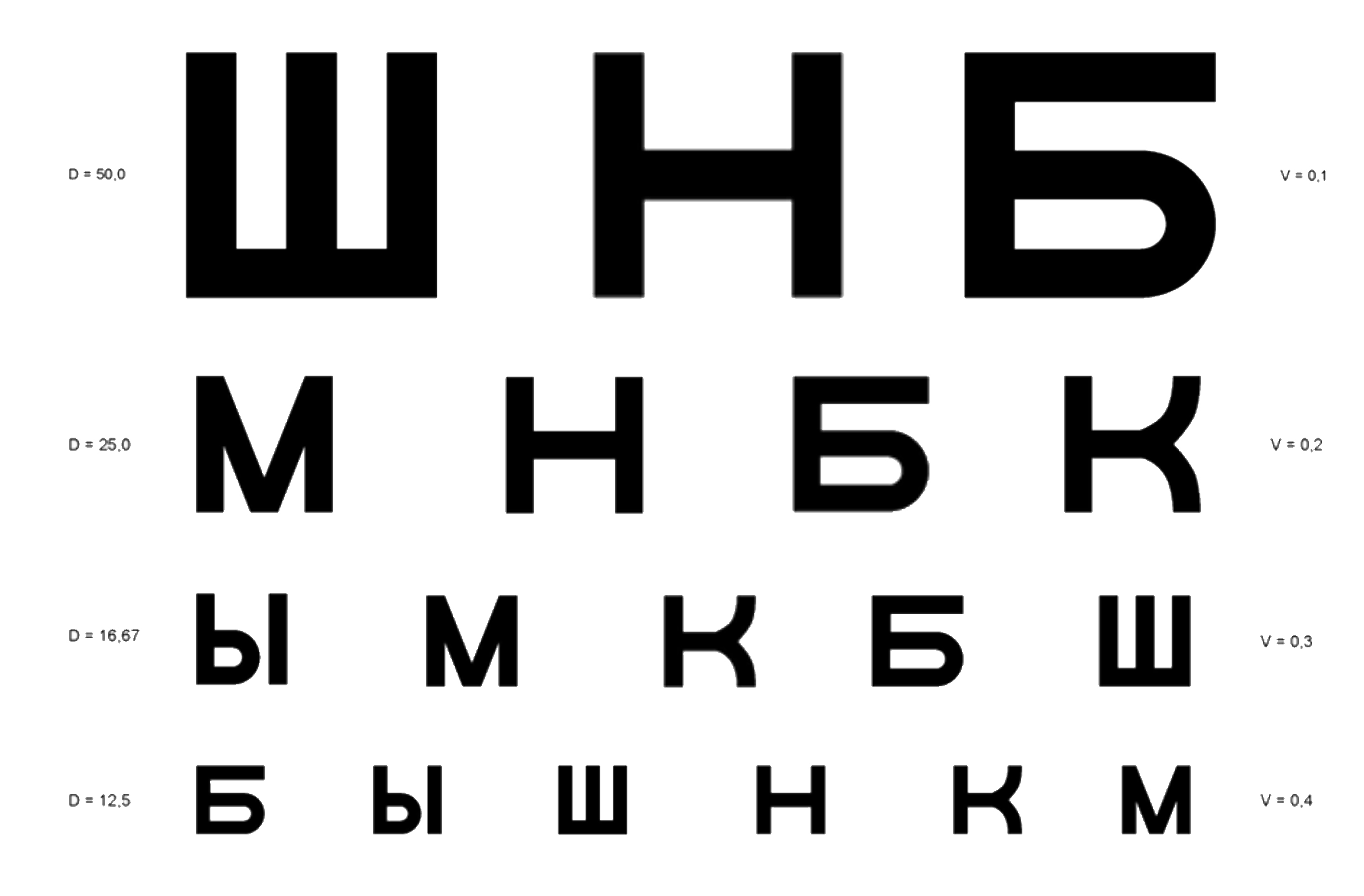

Black and white pattern identification at 1 arcminute angle is considered to be visual acuity of 1.0, which is around 1 mm per 3.44 m distance. A character 7 mm in size has 1.4 mm pattern gaps, so over the 5 m view distance it gives an angle of around 1 arcminutes (atan(0.007/5/5)≈0.963').

There are two types of the table. The first is shorter, second is longer version.
