= Eye chart =

Chart used to measure vision

- Snellen chart used for visual testing. In this case, the chart should be 20 feet (6 m) from the eyes.
- Uses: Vision testing
- Related items: Snellen chart; Landolt C; Lea test; logMAR chart

An eye chart is a chart used to measure visual acuity comprising lines of optotypes in ranges of sizes. Optotypes are the letters or symbols shown on an eye chart. Eye charts are often used by health care professionals, such as optometrists, physicians and nurses, to screen persons for vision impairment. Ophthalmologists, physicians who specialize in the eye, also use eye charts to monitor the visual acuity of their patients in response to various therapies such as medications or surgery.

The chart is placed at a standardized distance away from the person whose vision is being tested. The person then attempts to identify the optotypes on the chart, starting with the larger ones and continuing with progressively smaller ones until the person cannot identify the optotypes. The size of the smallest optotypes that can be reliably identified is considered the person's visual acuity.

The Snellen chart is the most widely used. Alternative types of eye charts include the logMAR chart, Landolt C, E chart, Lea test, Golovin–Sivtsev table, the Rosenbaum chart, and the Jaeger chart. Eye charts do not provide doctors with information on eye diseases such as glaucoma, problems with the retina, or loss of peripheral vision.

== History ==
The concept of using eye glasses in order to improve eyesight has been prevalent since the late thirteenth century. As science progressively improved, reputable doctors within the ophthalmology field like Franciscus Cornelius Donders began to describe a clear definition as to what should be done in order to improve impairments of a patient's vision. Although it slowly became clear which procedures benefitted patients, there was no uniform test to document impairment and improvement in someone's vision. Around this time, the knowledge within the field of ophthalmology grew immensely.

To measure visual acuity, in 1835 German ophthalmologist, Heinrich Küchler, made the first eye chart consisting of pictures of objects of decreasing size that patients were to identify. In 1843, he published another chart comprising alphabetic letters . In 1854, Austrian ophthalmologist, Eduard Jaeger created a chart comprising paragraphs with decreasing font sizes to test near vision acuity. In 1862, the then most effective and popular chart to test visual acuity was published by Dutch ophthalmologist Herman Snellen. Snellen was Donders' first assistant.

Because of Donders' fame and Snellen's natural talent towards the field of ophthalmology, many doctors were enticed to visit in order to share ideas with them in Utrecht. As he worked closely through his practice, Snellen created his own chart that measured visual acuity. Snellen's eye chart became the first of its type, hence it being the most scientifically reliable design in order to test vision distance in that time period. Snellen's success within his charts was because they differed from past models that measured visual acuity. His chart varied the sizes of stimuli. Snellen's eye chart opened the door to testing visual acuity, hence it became the global standard.

The high demand for this chart was everywhere. Even Japanese ophthalmologist Ema Tenko, who studied under Snellen, created an eye chart that was used in Japan. Because of the creation of eye charts, examinations like vision screening (roughly beginning in 1899) within schools took place in order to test children's eyes.

== Procedure ==
Charts display several rows of optotypes, which are standardized symbols for testing vision. Optotypes are usually letters, numbers, or geometric symbols. Each row of the chart depicts optotypes of a different size. Typically the largest optotypes are in the top row. The optotypes become progressively smaller towards the bottom of the chart.

The person removes any glasses or contact lenses, and stands or sits a standardized distance from the chart (e.g., 20 feet for the Snellen chart). The person is then asked to identify the optotypes on the chart, starting with large rows and continuing to smaller rows until the optotypes cannot be reliably identified any more. The row in which the person can reliably identify symbols defines the visual acuity.

One eye is tested at a time. Practically, this is accomplished by covering the other eye with a hand, piece of paper, or a small paddle. After testing without glasses or contact lenses, testing is repeated while the person wears them, if applicable. Often, the use of such refractive lenses will correct visual acuity to normal. Refractive error can be corrected using a pinhole occluder. If the visual acuity improves with the use of pinholes, refractive lenses can be utilized to improve visual acuity. Squinting can achieve the same effect as a pinhole occluder.

With the Snellen chart, the visual acuity is recorded as a fraction with 20 in the numerator (top number) and values ranging from 10 to 600 in the denominator (bottom number). The denominator indicates the distance in feet at which a person with normal vision could stand to correctly identify the same symbols identified by the person tested. For example, a visual acuity of 20/20 is considered normal.

== Variations ==
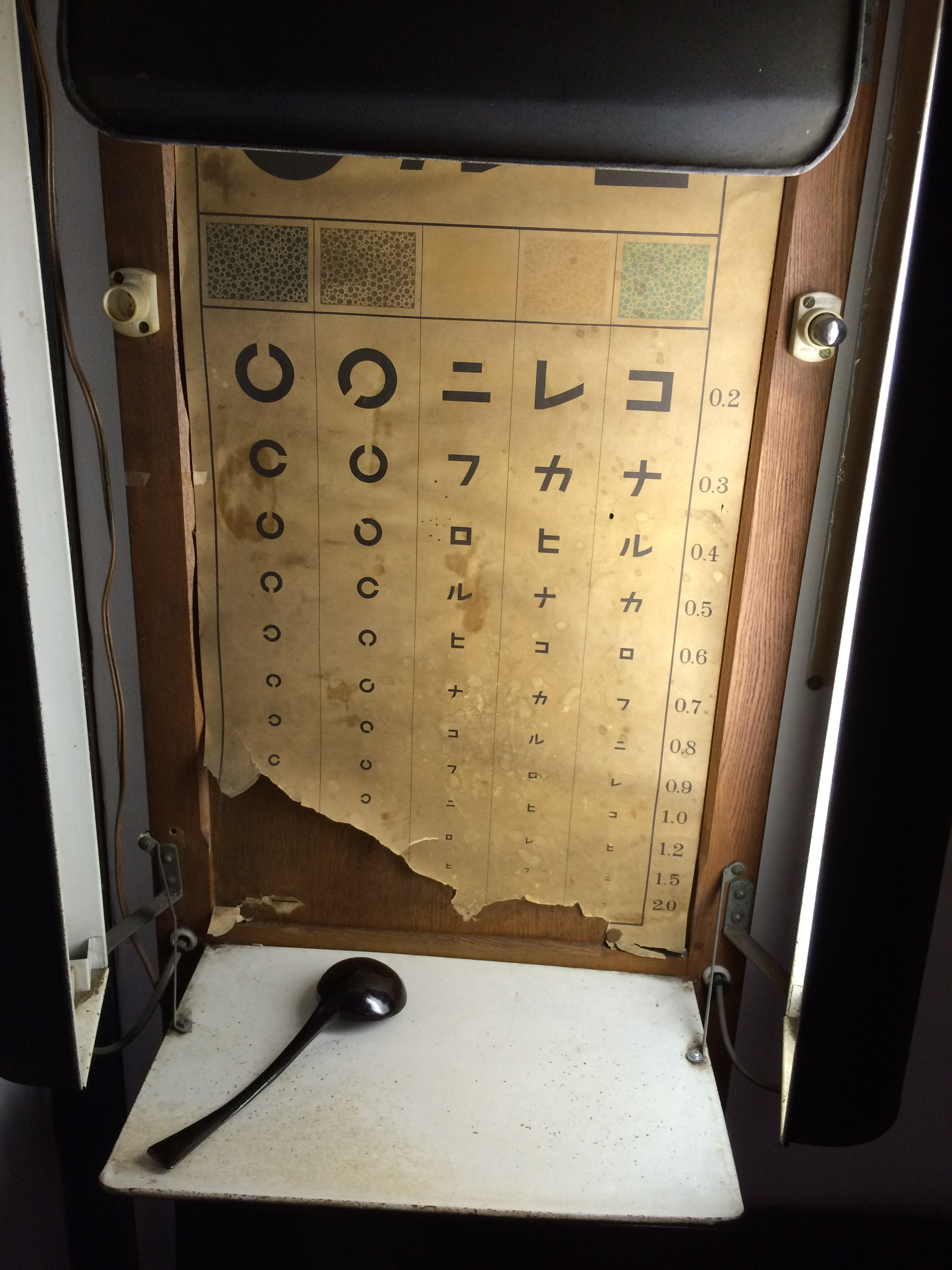
An example of the Landolt C eye chart (also known as the Japanese eye chart)

Numerous types of eye charts exist and are used in various situations. For example, the Snellen chart is designed for use at 6 meters or 20 feet, and is thus appropriate for testing distance vision, while the ETDRS chart is designed for use at 4 meters. There is often also a need to test a subject's vision at near or occupational tasks (such as reading or computer use). For these situations, a Rosenbaum chart or Jaeger chart can be used.

While the Snellen chart remains the default, some authors have argued that the logMAR chart is superior. The logMAR chart presents the same number of symbols on each line, uses a typeface with letters that are equally legible at various sizes, and by varying the symbol size logarithmically, it is easier to use at nonstandard distances. As a consequence of these improvements, the logMAR chart has been proposed as a more reliable tool for measuring visual acuity.

It can be difficult to measure visual acuity in infants, young children, and illiterate adults. Special eye charts such as Lea Symbols can be used. One version uses simple pictures or patterns. Others are printed with the block letter "E" turned in different orientations, the so-called Tumbling E. The patient simply indicates which direction each "E" is facing. The Landolt C chart is similar: rows have circles with different segments missing, and the test-taker describes where each broken piece is located. The last two kinds of charts also reduce the possibility of the patient guessing the images.

Parents and caregivers may test their child's eyesight from home to identify potential vision problems that require an eye care professional. Testing a child age three and older can be accomplished using the Tumbling E chart to play the "pointing game". For this test, the child sits in a chair 10 feet from the chart, gently holding an eye cover over one eye. The parent or caregiver points to each E, starting with the largest E. The child then points in the direction the E is facing (up, down, left, right). The smallest line with Es identified by the child can be recorded. The various directions the E can face should be reviewed with the child prior to home testing. Home tests are not as accurate as exams conducted by professional ophthalmologists. At home eye tests should not replace a visit to a professional eye care physician.

== Alternatives ==
Computer-based alternatives to the eye chart have been developed, but are not very common prior to smart phones with high display resolution and DPI becoming popular. They have several potential advantages, such as a more precise measurement, less examiner-induced bias and randomized optotypes.

Computer-based alternatives to traditional eye charts also incorporate innovative technologies that enhance testing accuracy. The "Eye Chart App" utilize sensors to measure the viewing distance of the user. This capability allows the software to automatically calibrate the display of the eye chart according to the measured distance.

If the person, particularly a young child, is unable to cooperate with visual acuity testing via an eye chart, practitioners can be alerted to possible deficits in visual acuity by asking parents whether the child appears to see well. A clue is that the child may hold objects close to the face when attempting to focus. Refractive error can be estimated via photography, a technique called photoscreening.

== Technical details ==
=== Optotype Crowding ===
Research has shown that optotype "crowding" reduces visual acuity at the fovea (as opposed to eccentric visual acuity) once the optotype characters are closer than 4.4 bar widths apart. This is referred to as the "critical spacing" for optotype letters at the fovea. For periphery visual acuity, the critical spacing is much greater, such that optotype characters closer than 15-20 bar widths apart negatively affect visual acuity.

== See also ==
- Golovin–Sivtsev table
- Landolt C
- Lea test
- Monoyer chart
- Snellen chart
