= Herman Snellen =

Dutch ophthalmologist (1834–1908)

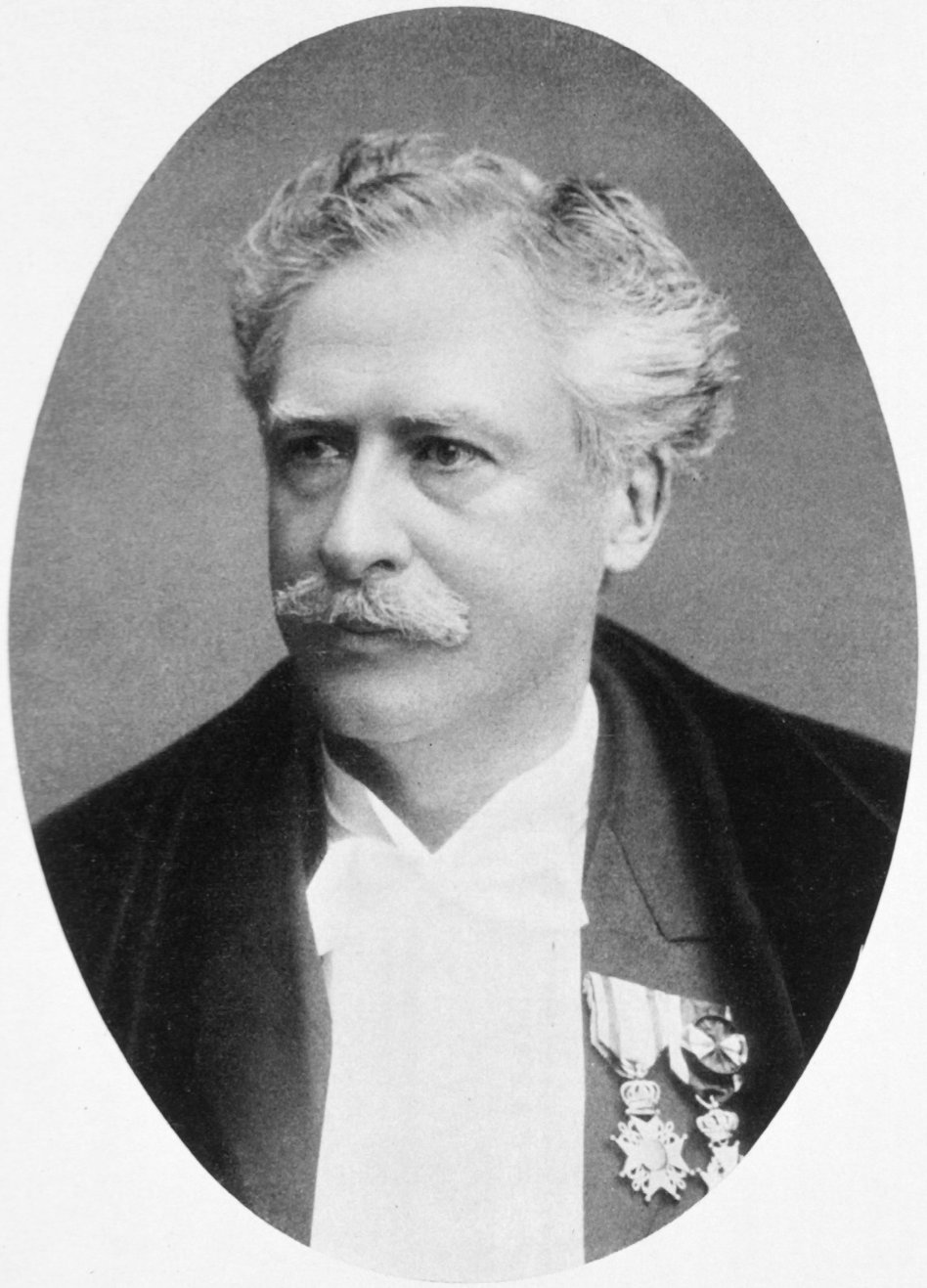
- Born: 19 February 1834; Zeist, Netherlands
- Died: 18 January 1908 (aged 73); Utrecht, Netherlands
- Known for: Snellen chart
- Scientific career
- Fields: ophthalmology
- Workplaces: Netherlands Hospital for Eye Patients

Typical Snellen chart to estimate visual acuity

Herman Snellen (Dutch pronunciation: [ˈɦɛrmɑn ˈsnɛlə(n)], February 19, 1834 – January 18, 1908) was a Dutch ophthalmologist who in 1862 introduced the Snellen chart to study visual acuity. He took over directorship of the Netherlands Hospital for Eye Patients (Nederlandsch Gasthuis voor Ooglijders), after Franciscus Donders. He was elected an International Member of the American Philosophical Society in 1894.

== Early life ==
Herman Snellen studied medicine at Utrecht University under Donders, Gerardus Johannes Mulder and Jacobus Schroeder van der Kolk. He earned his medical degree in 1858 from Leiden University. He specialized in ophthalmology and worked as an assistant physician at the Netherlands Hospital for Eye Patients after he had completed his degree.

== Director ==
He was named to succeed Donders as the institute's director in 1884, a position he served until 1903. In 1877, he was appointed as a professor of ophthalmology at Utrecht University. He did research on astigmatism, glaucoma and other eye diseases as well as research on correction of visual acuity using eyeglasses and ophthalmological surgery.

== Chart ==
Although alternative versions had been developed before him, by Eduard Jäger von Jaxtthal and others, in 1862 Snellen developed his eye chart to measure visual acuity.

The first edition of Snellen's book was in German. Over more than two decades, he published at least seven more editions of his book. The eighth edition contains charts in English, Italian, French, German, and a calligraphic hand of the Latin script of German. Snellen's charts became the global standard.

The most significant innovation was Snellen's use of what he called optotypes, specially designed characters generated on a 5x5 grid, rather than using standard fonts. They provide a physical standard measure that could be used when printing the chart. Standard vision was measured as the ability to correctly read a line of optotype characters when they subtended 5 minutes of arc and were separated by 1 minute of arc.

Since its inception, more copies of the Snellen Chart have been sold in the United States than any other poster. It remained a ubiquitous standard in medical offices into the 21st century.
