= Landolt C =

Optotype

Landolt C optotypes in various sizes and orientations

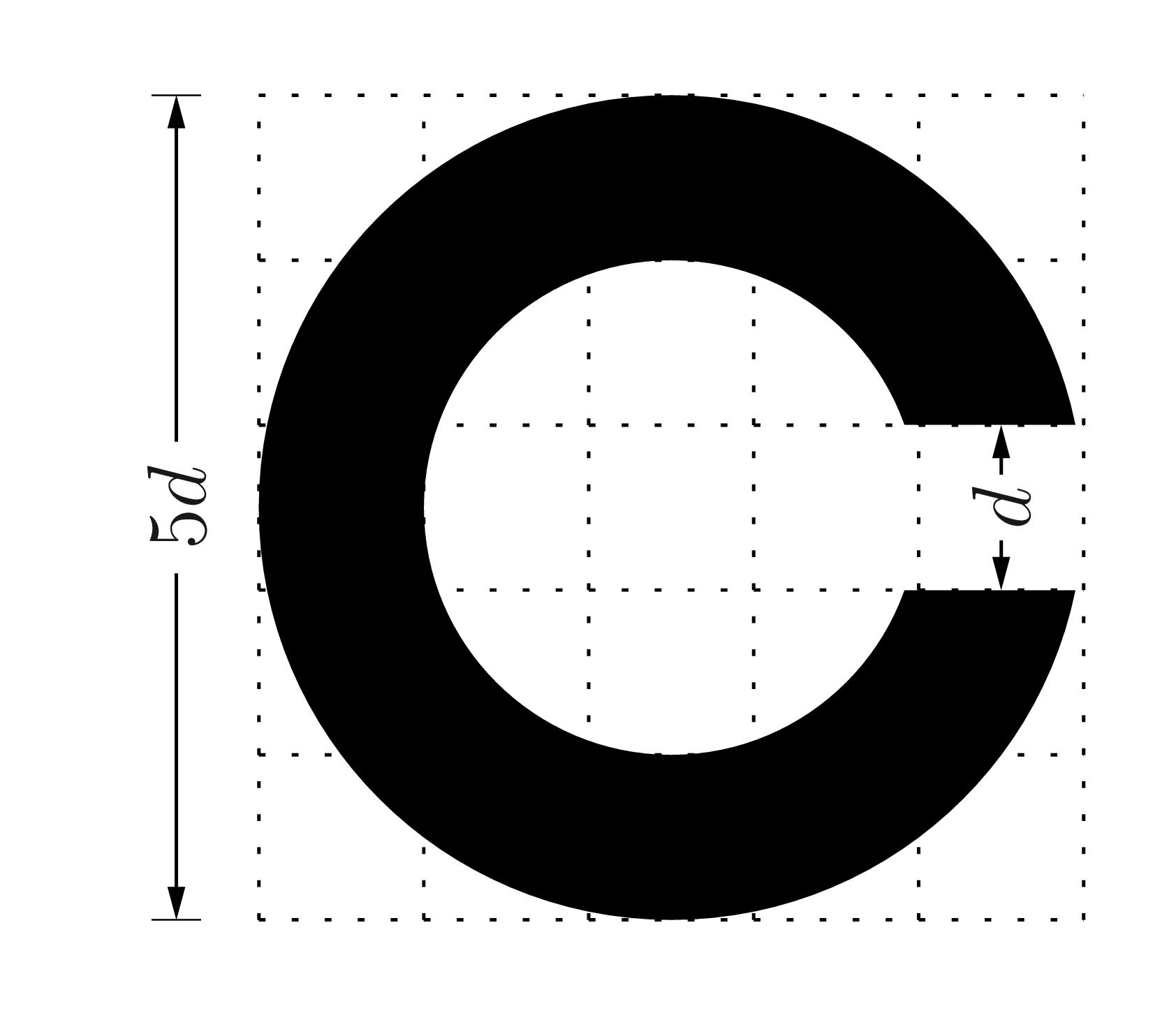
Landolt C optotype dimensions

The Landolt C, also known as a Landolt ring, Landolt broken ring, or Japanese vision test, is an optotype—a standardized symbol used for testing vision. It was developed by the Swiss-born ophthalmologist Edmund Landolt.

== Background ==
The Landolt C consists of a ring that has a gap, thus looking similar to the letter C. The gap can be at various positions (usually left, right, bottom, top and the 45° positions in between) and the task of the tested person is to decide on which side the gap is. The size of the C and its gap are reduced until the subject makes a specified rate of errors. The minimum perceivable angle of the gap is taken as measure of the visual acuity. It is generally practised in the laboratory.

The stroke width is 1/5 of the diameter, and the gap width is the same. This is identical to the letter C from a Snellen chart. The Landolt C is the standard optotype for acuity measurement in most European countries. It was standardized, together with measurement procedures, by the German DIN, as DIN 58220 (now EN ISO 8596).

Although accepted as a gold standard, this optotype has its own inherent problems, possibly due to higher brain function where the gap will appear closed near the limit of resolution. This is not due to the structure of the cornea or lens, and it is not due to astigmatic errors.

== See also ==
- Edmund Landolt
- Visual acuity
- E chart
- Golovin–Sivtsev table
