= May 9 =

May 9 this year in various calendars
- Saturday, 9 May 2026
Akan	Kwamemene
Armenian	23 Mareri 1475
Aztec	Xocotlhuetzi 19, 3 Mazātl
Babylonian	21 Nisanu, 2337 SE
Balinese pawukon	Menga, Beteng, Jaya, Umanis, Was, Saniscara of Taulu, Guru, Ogan, Sri
Bengali	26 Boisakh, BS 1433
Chinese	Yin Water Goat・Girl Mansion; Fire Horse Year, Month 3, Day 23 (Lixia, 12 days until Xiaoman)
Common Era	9 May 2026 CE
Coptic	1 Pashons, AM 1742
Egyptian	23 Thoth, 2775 NE
Ethiopian	1 Genbot, 2018 Amätä Məhrät
French Republican	Décade II, Décadi de Floréal de l'Année 234 de la République
Gregorian	9 May, AD 2026
Hebrew	22 Iyar, AM 5786; Omer 37
Hindu	Śravaṇa・Śukla; Solar: 26 Vaiśākha, 1948 SE; Lunisolar: Saptamī, Kṛishna pakṣa of Vaiśākha, 2083 VE; Rāudra・5127 KY・1,872,704
Icelandic	Laugardagur, 17 Harpa 2026
Islamic	22 Dhu al-Qi'dah, AH 1447 (using tabular method)
ISO week date	2026-W19-6
Japanese	23 Yayoi, Reiwa 8 (Rikka, 12 days until Shōman)
Julian	26 April, AD 2026 (AM 7534)
Julian day	2461170
Korean	23 Yongdal, 4359 DE
Maya	13.0.13.10.7; 0 Zip, 3 Manik
Roman	ante diem VI Kalendas Maias, MMDCCLXXIX AUC
Solar Hijri	19 Ordibehesht, SH 1405
Tibetan	22 lhag nag pa, me pho rta 2153 or 1772 or 1000

<<	May					>>
Su	Mo	Tu	We	Th	Fr	Sa
					1	2
3	4	5	6	7	8	9
10	11	12	13	14	15	16
17	18	19	20	21	22	23
24	25	26	27	28	29	30
31
2026

May 9 in recent years
2026 (Saturday)
2025 (Friday)
2024 (Thursday)
2023 (Tuesday)
2022 (Monday)
2021 (Sunday)
2020 (Saturday)
2019 (Thursday)
2018 (Wednesday)
2017 (Tuesday)

May 9 is the 129th day of the year (130th in leap years) in the Gregorian calendar; 236 days remain until the end of the year.

== Events ==
=== Pre-1600 ===
- 328 – Athanasius is elected Patriarch of Alexandria.
- 1009 – Lombard Revolt: Lombard forces led by Melus revolt in Bari against the Byzantine Catepanate of Italy.
- 1310 – Nephon, Bishop of Cyzicus, is consecrated as Patriarch of Constantinople.
- 1386 – England and Portugal formally ratify their alliance with the signing of the Treaty of Windsor, making it the oldest diplomatic alliance in the world which is still in force.
- 1450 – Timurid monarch 'Abd al-Latif is assassinated.
- 1502 – Christopher Columbus sets off from Cádiz for his fourth voyage.
- 1540 – Hernando de Alarcón sets sail on an expedition to the Gulf of California.

=== 1601–1900 ===
- 1645 – Scottish Royalist forces under Lord Montrose defeat Covenanter forces under John Urry.
- 1662 – The figure who later became Mr. Punch makes his first recorded appearance in England.
- 1671 – Thomas Blood, disguised as a clergyman, attempts to steal England's Crown Jewels from the Tower of London.
- 1726 – Five men arrested during a raid on Mother Clap's molly house in London are executed at Tyburn.
- 1761 – Exhibition of 1761, the inaugural exhibition of the Society of Artists of Great Britain, opens at Spring Gardens in London.
- 1864 – Second Schleswig War: The Danish navy defeats the Austrian and Prussian fleets in the Battle of Heligoland.
- 1865 – American Civil War: Nathan Bedford Forrest surrenders his forces at Gainesville, Alabama.
- 1865 – American Civil War: President Andrew Johnson issues a proclamation ending belligerent rights of the rebels and enjoining foreign nations to intern or expel Confederate ships.
- 1873 – Der Krach: The Vienna stock exchange crash begins the Panic of 1873 and heralds the Long Depression.
- 1877 – Mihail Kogălniceanu reads, in the Chamber of Deputies, the Declaration of Independence of Romania. The date will become recognised as the Independence Day of Romania.

=== 1901–present ===
- 1901 – Australia opens its first national parliament in Melbourne.
- 1915 – World War I: Second Battle of Artois between German and French forces.
- 1918 – World War I: Germany repels Britain's second attempt to blockade the port of Ostend, Belgium.
- 1920 – Polish–Soviet War: The Polish army under General Edward Rydz-Śmigły celebrates its capture of Kiev with a victory parade on Khreshchatyk.
- 1926 – Admiral Richard E. Byrd and Floyd Bennett claim to have flown over the North Pole (later discovery of Byrd's diary appears to cast some doubt on the claim).
- 1927 – The Old Parliament House, Canberra, Australia, officially opens.
- 1936 – Italy formally annexes Ethiopia after taking the capital Addis Ababa on May 5.
- 1941 – World War II: The German submarine U-110 is captured by the Royal Navy. On board is the latest Enigma machine which Allied cryptographers later use to break coded German messages.
- 1942 – The Holocaust in Ukraine: The SS executes 588 Jewish residents of the Podolian town of Zinkiv (Khmelnytska oblast). The Zoludek Ghetto (in Belarus) is destroyed and all its inhabitants executed or deported.
- 1945 – World War II: The Channel Islands are liberated from Nazi occupation.
- 1946 – King Victor Emmanuel III of Italy abdicates and is succeeded by Umberto II.
- 1948 – Czechoslovakia's Ninth-of-May Constitution comes into effect.
- 1950 – Robert Schuman presents the "Schuman Declaration", considered by some to be the beginning of the creation of what is now the European Union.
- 1955 – Cold War: West Germany joins NATO.
- 1960 – The Food and Drug Administration announces it will approve birth control as an additional indication for Searle's Enovid, making Enovid the world's first approved oral contraceptive pill.
- 1969 – Carlos Lamarca leads the first urban guerrilla action against the military dictatorship of Brazil in São Paulo, by robbing two banks.
- 1974 – Watergate scandal: The United States House Committee on the Judiciary opens formal and public impeachment hearings against President Richard Nixon.
- 1979 – Iranian Jewish businessman Habib Elghanian is executed by firing squad in Tehran, prompting the mass exodus of the once 100,000-strong Jewish community of Iran.
- 1980 – In Florida, United States, Liberian freighter MV Summit Venture collides with the Sunshine Skyway Bridge over Tampa Bay, making a 430-meter (1,400 ft) section of the southbound span collapse. Thirty-five people in six cars and a Greyhound bus fall 46 metres (150 ft) into the water and die.
- 1980 – In Norco, California, United States, five masked gunmen hold up a Security Pacific bank, leading to a violent shoot-out and one of the largest pursuits in California history. Two of the gunmen and one police officer are killed and thirty-three police and civilian vehicles are destroyed in the chase.
- 1987 – LOT Flight 5055 Tadeusz Kościuszko crashes after takeoff in Warsaw, Poland, killing all 183 people on board.
- 1988 – New Parliament House, Canberra officially opens.
- 1992 – Armenian forces capture Shusha, marking a major turning point in the First Nagorno-Karabakh War.
- 1992 – Westray Mine disaster kills 26 workers in Nova Scotia, Canada.
- 1999 – Mother's Day bus crash kills 22 passengers and injures another 22, including the driver in New Orleans, Louisiana, United States.
- 2001 – In Ghana, 129 football fans die in what became known as the Accra Sports Stadium disaster. The deaths are caused by a stampede (caused by the firing of tear gas by police personnel at the stadium) that followed a controversial decision by the referee.
- 2002 – The 38-day stand-off in the Church of the Nativity in Bethlehem comes to an end when the Palestinians inside agree to have 13 suspected terrorists among them deported to several different countries.
- 2018 – Barisan Nasional, the coalition that had governed Malaysia since the country's independence in 1957, suffer a historic defeat in the 2018 Malaysian general election.
- 2020 – The COVID-19 recession causes the U.S. unemployment rate to hit 14.9 percent, its worst rate since the Great Depression.
- 2022 – Russo-Ukrainian war: United States President Joe Biden signs the 2022 Lend-Lease Act into law, a rebooted World War II-era policy attempting to expedite American equipment to Ukraine and other Eastern European countries.
- 2023 – The May 9 riots following the arrest of Imran Khan in Pakistan.

== Births ==
=== Pre-1600 ===
- 1147 – Minamoto no Yoritomo, Japanese shōgun (died 1199)
- 1151 – al-Adid, last Fatimid caliph (died 1171)
- 1540 – Maharana Pratap, Indian ruler (died 1597)
- 1555 – Jerónima de la Asunción, Spanish Catholic nun and founder of the first monastery in Manila (died 1630)
- 1594 – Louis Henry, Prince of Nassau-Dillenburg, military leader in the Thirty Years' War (died 1662)

=== 1601–1900 ===
- 1617 – Frederick, Landgrave of Hesse-Eschwege (died 1655)
- 1740 – Giovanni Paisiello, Italian composer and educator (probable; (died 1816)
- 1746 – Gaspard Monge, French mathematician and engineer (died 1818)
- 1763 – János Batsányi, Hungarian-Austrian poet and author (died 1845)
- 1800 – John Brown, American abolitionist (died 1859)
- 1801 – Peter Hesketh-Fleetwood, English politician, founded the town of Fleetwood (died 1866)
- 1814 – John Brougham, Irish-American actor and playwright (died 1880)
- 1823 – Frederick Weld, English-New Zealand politician, 6th Prime Minister of New Zealand (died 1891)
- 1824 – Jacob ben Moses Bachrach, Polish apologist and author (died 1896)
- 1825 – James Collinson, Victorian painter (died 1881)
- 1836 – Ferdinand Monoyer, French ophthalmologist, invented the Monoyer chart (died 1912)
- 1837 – Adam Opel, German engineer, founded the Opel Company (died 1895)
- 1845 – Gustaf de Laval, Swedish engineer and businessman (died 1913)
- 1850 – Edward Weston, English-American chemist (died 1936)
- 1855 – Julius Röntgen, German-Dutch composer (died 1932)
- 1860 – J. M. Barrie, Scottish novelist and playwright (died 1937)
- 1866 – Gopal Krishna Gokhale, Indian economist and politician (died 1915)
- 1870 – Harry Vardon, British golfer (died 1937)
- 1873 – Anton Cermak, Czech-American captain and politician, 44th Mayor of Chicago (died 1933)
- 1874 – Howard Carter, English archaeologist and historian (died 1939)
- 1882 – George Barker, American painter (died 1965)
- 1882 – Henry J. Kaiser, American shipbuilder and businessman, founded Kaiser Shipyards (died 1967)
- 1883 – José Ortega y Gasset, Spanish philosopher, author, and critic (died 1955)
- 1884 – Valdemar Psilander, Danish actor (died 1917)
- 1885 – Gianni Vella, Maltese artist (died 1977)
- 1888 – Francesco Baracca, Italian fighter pilot (died 1918)
- 1888 – Rolf de Maré, Swedish art collector (died 1964)
- 1892 – Zita of Bourbon-Parma, last Empress of the Austro-Hungarian Empire (died 1989)
- 1893 – William Moulton Marston, American psychologist and author (died 1947)
- 1894 – Benjamin Graham, British-American economist, professor, and investor (died 1976)
- 1895 – Richard Barthelmess, American actor (died 1963)
- 1895 – Lucian Blaga, Romanian poet, playwright, and philosopher (died 1961)
- 1895 – Frank Foss, American pole vaulter (died 1989)
- 1896 – Richard Day, Canadian-American art director and set decorator (died 1972)
- 1900 – Maria Malicka, Polish stage and film actress (died 1992)

=== 1901–present ===
- 1907 – Jackie Grant, Trinidadian cricketer (died 1978)
- 1907 – Baldur von Schirach, German politician (died 1974)
- 1908 – Billy Jurges, American baseball player and manager (died 1997)
- 1909 – Gordon Bunshaft, American architect, designed the Solow Building (died 1990)
- 1912 – Pedro Armendáriz, Mexican-American actor (died 1963)
- 1914 – Carlo Maria Giulini, Italian conductor and director (died 2005)
- 1914 – J. Merrill Knapp, American musicologist (died 1993)
- 1914 – Hank Snow, Canadian-American country music singer-songwriter and guitarist (died 1999)
- 1918 – Mike Wallace, American journalist (died 2012)
- 1921 – Daniel Berrigan, American priest, poet, and activist (died 2016)
- 1921 – Sophie Scholl, German activist (died 1943)
- 1924 – Bulat Okudzhava, Russian singer, poet, and author (died 1997)
- 1927 – Manfred Eigen, German chemist and academic, Nobel Prize laureate (died 2019)
- 1928 – Pancho Gonzales, American tennis player (died 1995)
- 1928 – Barbara Ann Scott, Canadian figure skater (died 2012)
- 1930 – Joan Sims, English actress (died 2001)
- 1931 – Vance D. Brand, American pilot, engineer, and astronaut
- 1932 – Geraldine McEwan, English actress (died 2015)
- 1934 – Alan Bennett, English screenwriter, playwright, and novelist
- 1935 – Nokie Edwards, American guitarist (died 2018)
- 1936 – Albert Finney, English actor (died 2019)
- 1936 – Glenda Jackson, English actress and politician (died 2023)
- 1938 – Carroll Cole, American serial killer (died 1985)
- 1938 – Charles Simić, Serbian-American poet and editor (died 2023)
- 1939 – Ion Țiriac, Romanian tennis player and manager
- 1940 – James L. Brooks, American director, producer, and screenwriter
- 1941 – Dorothy Hyman, English sprinter
- 1942 – John Ashcroft, American lawyer and politician, 79th United States Attorney General
- 1942 – David Gergen, American political consultant (died 2025)
- 1943 – Vince Cable, English economist and politician, former Secretary of State for Business, Innovation and Skills
- 1943 – Colin Pillinger, English astronomer, chemist, and academic (died 2014)
- 1945 – Jupp Heynckes, German footballer and manager
- 1946 – Candice Bergen, American actress and producer
- 1947 – Yukiya Amano, Japanese diplomat (died 2019)
- 1948 – Calvin Murphy, American basketball player and radio host
- 1949 – Billy Joel, American singer-songwriter and pianist
- 1951 – Alley Mills, American actress
- 1951 – Joy Harjo, American poet, musician, playwright and author, 23rd United States Poet Laureate
- 1955 – Meles Zenawi, Prime Minister of Ethiopia (died 2012)
- 1955 – Anne Sofie von Otter, Swedish soprano and actress
- 1956 – Wendy Crewson, Canadian actress and producer
- 1956 – Jana Wendt, Australian television host
- 1958 – Chuck Russell, American film director and producer (died 2026)
- 1960 – Tony Gwynn, American baseball player and coach (died 2014)
- 1961 – John Corbett, American actor
- 1965 – Steve Yzerman, Canadian ice hockey player and manager
- 1968 – Ruth Kelly, British economist and politician, Secretary of State for Transport
- 1968 – Marie-José Pérec, French sprinter
- 1970 – Doug Christie, American basketball player and coach
- 1970 – Hao Haidong, Chinese footballer
- 1970 – Ghostface Killah, American rapper and actor
- 1973 – Tegla Loroupe, Kenyan runner
- 1975 – Tamia, Canadian singer-songwriter, producer, and actress
- 1977 – Averno, Mexican wrestler
- 1977 – Marek Jankulovski, Czech footballer
- 1977 – Svein Tuft, Canadian cyclist
- 1979 – Rosario Dawson, American actress
- 1979 – Brandon Webb, American baseball player
- 1980 – Grant Hackett, Australian swimmer
- 1983 – Gilles Müller, Luxembourgian tennis player
- 1984 – Prince Fielder, American baseball player
- 1987 – Scott Bolton, Australian rugby league player
- 1987 – Kevin Gameiro, French footballer
- 1988 – J. R. Fitzpatrick, Canadian racing driver
- 1989 – Ellen White, English footballer
- 1989 – Daniel Rosenfeld, German musician
- 1991 – Majlinda Kelmendi, Kosovar judoka
- 1992 – Dan Burn, English footballer
- 1995 – Tommy Edman, American baseball player
- 1995 – Beth Mead, English footballer
- 1995 – Shaboozey, American rapper and singer-songwriter
- 1996 – Noah Centineo, American actor
- 2000 – Trey Lance, American football player

== Deaths ==
=== Pre-1600 ===
- 480 – Julius Nepos, Western Roman Emperor
- 729 – Osric, king of Northumbria
- 893 – Shi Pu, warlord of the Tang Dynasty
- 909 – Adalgar, archbishop of Hamburg-Bremen
- 934 – Wang Sitong, Chinese general and governor (born 892)
- 1280 – Magnus VI of Norway
- 1315 – Hugh V, Duke of Burgundy (born 1282)
- 1329 – John Drokensford, Bishop of Bath and Wells
- 1443 – Niccolò Albergati, Italian Cardinal and diplomat (born 1373)
- 1446 – Mary of Enghien (born 1368)
- 1590 – Charles de Bourbon French cardinal and pretender to the throne (born 1523)

=== 1601–1900 ===
- 1657 – William Bradford, English-American politician, 2nd Governor of Plymouth Colony (born 1590)
- 1707 – Dieterich Buxtehude, German-Danish organist and composer (born 1637)
- 1736 – Diogo de Mendonça Corte-Real, Portuguese judge and politician (born 1658)
- 1745 – Tomaso Antonio Vitali, Italian violinist and composer (born 1663)
- 1747 – John Dalrymple, 2nd Earl of Stair, Scottish field marshal and diplomat, British Ambassador to France (born 1673)
- 1760 – Nicolaus Zinzendorf, German bishop and saint (born 1700)
- 1789 – Jean-Baptiste Vaquette de Gribeauval, French general and engineer (born 1715)
- 1790 – William Clingan, American politician (born 1721)
- 1791 – Francis Hopkinson, American judge and politician (born 1737)
- 1805 – Friedrich Schiller, German poet, playwright, and historian (born 1759)
- 1850 – Joseph Louis Gay-Lussac, French chemist and physicist (born 1778)
- 1850 – Garlieb Merkel, Baltic German author and activist (born 1769)
- 1861 – Ernst von Lasaulx, German philologist and politician (born 1805)
- 1864 – John Sedgwick, American general and educator (born 1813)
- 1889 – William S. Harney, American general (born 1800)

=== 1901–present ===
- 1906 – Oscar von Gebhardt, German theologian and academic (born 1844)
- 1911 – Thomas Wentworth Higginson, American abolitionist (born 1823)
- 1914 – C. W. Post, American businessman, founded Post Foods (born 1854)
- 1915 – François Faber, Luxembourgian-French cyclist and soldier (born 1887)
- 1915 – Anthony Wilding, New Zealand tennis player and cricketer (born 1883)
- 1918 – George Coșbuc, Romanian journalist and poet (born 1866)
- 1931 – Albert Abraham Michelson, German-American physicist and academic, Nobel Prize laureate (born 1852)
- 1933 – John Arthur Jarvis, English swimmer (born 1872)
- 1935 – Ernst Bresslau, German zoologist (born 1877)
- 1938 – Thomas B. Thrige, Danish businessman (born 1866)
- 1942 – Józef Cebula, Polish priest and saint (born 1902)
- 1944 – Han Yong-un, Korean poet and social reformer (born 1879)
- 1949 – Louis II, Prince of Monaco (born 1870)
- 1950 – Esteban Terradas i Illa, Spanish mathematician and engineer (born 1883)
- 1957 – Ernest de Silva, Sri Lankan banker and businessman (born 1887)
- 1957 – Ezio Pinza, Italian actor and singer (born 1892)
- 1959 – Bhaurao Patil, Indian activist and educator (born 1887)
- 1965 – Leopold Figl, Austrian engineer and politician, 18th Chancellor of Austria (born 1902)
- 1968 – Mercedes de Acosta, American author, poet, and playwright (born 1893)
- 1968 – Harold Gray, American cartoonist, created Little Orphan Annie (born 1894)
- 1968 – Marion Lorne, American actress (born 1883)
- 1968 – Finlay Currie, British actor (born 1878)
- 1970 – Walter Reuther, American union leader (born 1907)
- 1976 – Jens Bjørneboe, Norwegian author, poet, and playwright (born 1920)
- 1976 – Ulrike Meinhof, German militant, co-founded the Red Army Faction (born 1934)
- 1977 – James Jones, American novelist (born 1921)
- 1978 – Giuseppe Impastato, Italian journalist and activist (born 1948)
- 1978 – Aldo Moro, Italian lawyer and politician, 38th Prime Minister of Italy (born 1916)
- 1979 – Cyrus S. Eaton, Canadian-American banker, businessman, and philanthropist (born 1883)
- 1979 – Eddie Jefferson, American singer and lyricist (born 1918)
- 1980 – Kate Molale, South African activist (born 1928)
- 1981 – Nelson Algren, American novelist and short story writer (born 1909)
- 1981 – Rolf Just Nilsen, Norwegian singer and actor (born 1931)
- 1983 – Henry Bachtold, Australian soldier and railway engineer (born 1891)
- 1985 – Edmond O'Brien, American actor and director (born 1915)
- 1986 – Tenzing Norgay, Nepalese mountaineer (born 1914)
- 1987 – Obafemi Awolowo, Nigerian lawyer and politician (born 1909)
- 1989 – Keith Whitley, American singer-songwriter and guitarist (born 1954)
- 1993 – Penelope Gilliatt, English novelist, short story writer, and critic (born 1932)
- 1994 – Elias Motsoaledi, South African activist (born 1924)
- 1997 – Rawya Ateya, Egyptian captain and politician (born 1926)
- 1997 – Marco Ferreri, Italian actor, director, and screenwriter (born 1928)
- 1998 – Alice Faye, American actress and singer (born 1915)
- 1998 – Talat Mahmood, Indian singer and actor (born 1924)
- 2003 – Russell B. Long, American lieutenant, lawyer, and politician (born 1918)
- 2004 – Akhmad Kadyrov, Chechen cleric and politician, 1st President of the Chechen Republic (born 1951)
- 2004 – Alan King, American actor, producer, and screenwriter (born 1927)
- 2004 – Brenda Fassie, South African singer (born 1964)
- 2007 – Dwight Wilson, Canadian soldier (born 1901)
- 2008 – Jack Gibson, Australian rugby league player, coach, and sportscaster (born 1929)
- 2008 – Baptiste Manzini, American football player (born 1920)
- 2008 – Nuala O'Faolain, Irish journalist and producer (born 1942)
- 2008 – Pascal Sevran, French singer, television host, and author (born 1945)
- 2009 – Chuck Daly, American basketball player and coach (born 1930)
- 2010 – Lena Horne, American singer, actress, and activist (born 1917)
- 2010 – Otakar Motejl, Czech lawyer and politician (born 1932)
- 2011 – Wouter Weylandt, Belgian cyclist (born 1984)
- 2012 – Bertram Cohler, American psychologist, psychoanalyst, and academic (born 1938)
- 2012 – Geoffrey Henry, Cook Islander lawyer and politician, 3rd Prime Minister of the Cook Islands (born 1940)
- 2012 – Vidal Sassoon, English-American hairdresser and businessman (born 1928)
- 2013 – Ramón Blanco Rodríguez, Spanish footballer and manager (born 1952)
- 2013 – George M. Leader, American soldier and politician, 36th Governor of Pennsylvania (born 1918)
- 2013 – Humberto Lugo Gil, Mexican lawyer and politician, 23rd Governor of Hidalgo (born 1933)
- 2013 – Ottavio Missoni, Italian hurdler and fashion designer, founded Missoni (born 1921)
- 2014 – Giacomo Bini, Italian priest and missionary (born 1938)
- 2014 – Harlan Mathews, American lawyer and politician (born 1927)
- 2014 – Nedurumalli Janardhana Reddy, Indian politician, 12th Chief Minister of Andhra Pradesh (born 1935)
- 2014 – Mary Stewart, British author and poet (born 1916)
- 2015 – Edward W. Estlow, American football player and journalist (born 1920)
- 2015 – Kenan Evren, Turkish general and politician, 7th President of Turkey (born 1917)
- 2015 – Elizabeth Wilson, American actress (born 1921)
- 2017 – Robert Miles, a Swiss-born Italian record producer, composer, musician and DJ (born 1969)
- 2018 – Per Kirkeby, Danish painter, poet, film maker and sculptor (born 1938)
- 2019 – Freddie Starr, English comedian, impressionist, singer and actor (born 1943)
- 2020 – Little Richard, American singer, songwriter, and pianist (born 1932)
- 2022 – John Leo, American a writer and journalist (born 1935)
- 2022 – Rieko Kodama, Japanese game developer (born 1963)
- 2024 – Sean Burroughs, American baseball player (born 1980)
- 2024 – Roger Corman, American film director, producer, and actor (born 1926)
- 2024 – Rex Murphy, Canadian political commentator (born 1947)

== Holidays and observances ==
- Christian feast day:
  - Beatus of Vendome
  - Christopher (Eastern Orthodox Church)
  - George Preca
  - Gerontius of Cervia
  - Gregory of Nazianzen (The Episcopal Church (US) and traditional Roman Catholic calendar)
  - Blessed Karolina Gerhardinger
  - Nicolaus Zinzendorf (Lutheran)
  - Pachomius the Great
  - Blessed Thomas Pickering
  - Tudy of Landevennec
  - May 9 (Eastern Orthodox liturgics)
- Commemoration of the end of the German occupation of the Channel Islands related observances:
  - Liberation Day, commemorating the end of the German occupation of the Channel Islands during World War II. (Guernsey and Jersey)
  - National Day (Alderney)
- Europe Day, commemorating the Schuman Declaration. (European Union, Kosovo, Moldova, Ukraine)
- Victory Day observances, celebration of the Soviet Union victory over Nazi Germany (Soviet Union, Azerbaijan, Belarus, Bosnia and Herzegovina, Georgia, Israel, Kazakhstan, Kyrgyzstan, Moldova, Russia, Serbia, Tajikistan, Turkmenistan, Uzbekistan)
  - Victory and Peace Day, marks the capture of Shusha (1992) in the First Nagorno-Karabakh War, and the end of World War II. (Armenia)
- Home Front Heroes Day in the United States (proposed; locally observed in Dallas, Texas)
- Goku Day (Japan), commemorating the fictional character Goku.
