= May 9 (Eastern Orthodox liturgics) =

Day in the Eastern Orthodox liturgical calendar

Eastern Orthodox liturgical calendar
May 8	May 9	May 10
May 9 O.S. ≍ May 22 N.S. May 9 N.S ≍ April 26 O.S.

An Eastern Orthodox cross

May 9 in Eastern Orthodox liturgical calendars is a feast day and a day of commemoration of saints and martyrs. Although some Orthodox churches use the Revised Julian Calendar and others use the traditional Julian calendar, the fixed commemorations for their respective May 9 are broadly the same, no matter which calendar is used. (Note: Despite the dates being the same, the days to which they refer typically differ by 13 days. The notation Old Style or O.S. is sometimes used to indicate a date in the traditional Julian Calendar (the "Old Calendar"). The notation New Style or N.S. indicates a date in the Revised Julian calendar (the "New Calendar").)

== Saints ==
- Prophet Isaiah (8th century BC)
- Great-martyr Christopher of Lycia (c. 250) (Note: Name days celebrated today include: Christopher (Χριστόφορος).) and with him:

- Martyrs Callinica (Callinike of Lycia), Aquilina (Aquilina of Lycia) and 200 soldiers (c. 250)

- Saint Maximus III of Jerusalem, Patriarch (350) (see also: August 26)
- Saint Shio of Mgvime, monk, of Georgia (6th century)
- Monk-martyr Nicholas of Vouneni, in Thessaly (901)

== Pre-Schism Western saints ==
- Saint Beatus, Apostle of Switzerland (2nd century) (Note: An early hermit, venerated as the Apostle of Switzerland. His hermitage was at the place now called Beatenberg above the Lake of Thun.)
- Martyr Epimachus of Pelusium, at Alexandria (250)
- Martyr Gordion, at Rome (362)
- Saint John of Châlon, third Bishop of Châlon-sur-Saône in France (c. 475)
- Saint Gerontius, bishop of Cervia near Ravenna in Italy, martyr (c. 501)
- Saint Sanctan, Bishop of Kill-da-Les and Kill-na-Sanctan near Dublin in Ireland (6th century)
- Blessed Adalgar, third archbishop of Hamburg-Bremen (909)
- Saint Vincent, Abbot of St Peter de Montes in Spain (es), a disciple and successor of St. Gennadius of Astorga (c. 950)
- Saint Gregory, Bishop of Ostia (c. 1044)

== Post-Schism Orthodox saints ==
- Saint Dmitry Donskoy, Prince of Moscow (1389) (see also: May 19)
- Saint Joseph (Litovkin) of Optina, Hiero-schema-monk of Optina Monastery (1911) (Note: A Ukrainian, St Joseph was a holy Elder in the tradition of St Paisius Velichkovsky (as were the other 13 glorified holy Elders). The Optina Monastery is, in fact, a spiritual fruit of the Ukrainian Paisian spiritual heritage. There are 16 New Venerable Martyrs of Optina of the Soviet era, among whom are also Ukrainians.) (Note: See: (in Russian) Иосиф Оптинский. Википедии. (Russian Wikipedia).)
- Venerable Elder Ieronymos of Simonopetra (1957) (Note: On October 20, 2019, at the Protaton Church in Karyes on Mt. Athos, Ecumenical Patriarch Bartholomew announced the glorification of four great 20th-century Athonite elders would soon proceed, including: Daniel of Katounakia (†1929); Ieronymos of Simonopetra (†1957); Joseph the Hesychast (†1959), and; Ephraim of Katounakia (†1998).; The official statement from the Ecumenical Patriarchate was made on November 27, 2019: (in Greek) "Εἰδικώτερον, ἡ Ἁγία καί Ἱερά Σύνοδος, ἀποδεχθεῖσα εἰσήγησιν τῆς Κανονικῆς Ἐπιτροπῆς ἀνέγραψεν εἰς τό Ἁγιολόγιον τῆς Ὀρθοδόξου Ἐκκλησίας τούς ἐγνωσμένης ὁσιακῆς βιοτῆς καί πολιτείας Ἱερομόναχον Ἱερώνυμον Σιμωνοπετρίτην, Καθηγούμενον χρηματίσαντα τῆς ἐν Ἁγίῳ Ὄρει Ἱερᾶς Βασιλικῆς, Πατριαρχικῆς καί Σταυροπηγιακῆς Μονῆς Σίμωνος Πέτρας, καί ἀκολούθως Οἰκονόμον καί Πνευματικόν τοῦ Μετοχίου Ἀναλήψεως Βύρωνος Ἀττικῆς, καί Ἀρχιμανδρίτην Σωφρόνιον Σαχάρωφ, Καθηγούμενον χρηματίσαντα καί κτίτορα τῆς ἐν Ἔσσεξ Ἀγγλίας Ἱερᾶς Πατριαρχικῆς καί Σταυροπηγιακῆς Μονῆς Τιμίου Προδρόμου.") (Note: On April 20, 1920, the Sunday of the Holy Myrrhbearers, he was enthroned as the Abbot of the Monastery of his repentance (Simonopetra). On June 15, 1931, he was exiled to the Monastery of Koutloumousiou and in three months he was sent to the "Metochion" ("Dependency") of Simonopetra in Athens, named after the Holy Ascension of Christ. In 1937 he was re-elected Abbot of Simonopetra, but he declined this, and he remained at Holy Ascension for twenty more years, until he reposed on January 7th 1957 (the feast of Christmas on the Old Calendar). Therefore, he lived 17 years in his homeland of Asia Minor, 43 years in the Monastery of Simonopetra and 26 years at Holy Ascension in Athens.) (Note: See: (in Greek) Όσιος Ιερώνυμος Σιμωνοπετρίτης ο Μικρασιάτης. Βικιπαίδεια. (Greek Wikipedia).) (see also: April 26 - OS)

=== New martyrs and confessors ===
- New Hieromartyr Dimitry Voskresensky, Archpriest, of Anastasovo, Chuvashia (1938) (Note: See: (in Russian) Воскресенский, Дмитрий Васильевич. Википедии. (Russian Wikipedia).)
- New Hieromartyr Basil Kolosov, Priest (1939)
- Hieromartyr Elijah Rodić (Ilija Rodić), martyred during World War II in Trubar (1942) (Note: St. Ilija Rodić (†1942) a Prizren Seminary graduate, president of the literary society Rastko, poet, and father, was executed without trial on April 7, 1942, by local partisan forces under the command of Milutin Morača, and later rehabilitated in 1957 by the Military Court in Zagreb.) (Note: See: Drvar uprising.)

== Other commemorations ==
- Translation of the Relics of Saint Nicholas from Myra to Bari (1087) (see also: May 20)
- Zaraysk Icon of St. Nicholas the Wonderworker (1225)
- Translation of the relics (1775) of Child-martyr Gabriel of Slutsk (1690)

== Icon gallery ==
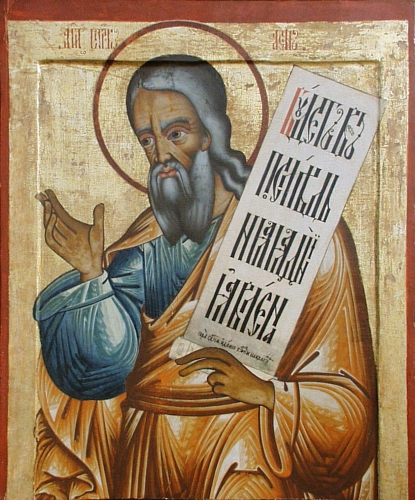
Prophet Isaiah.

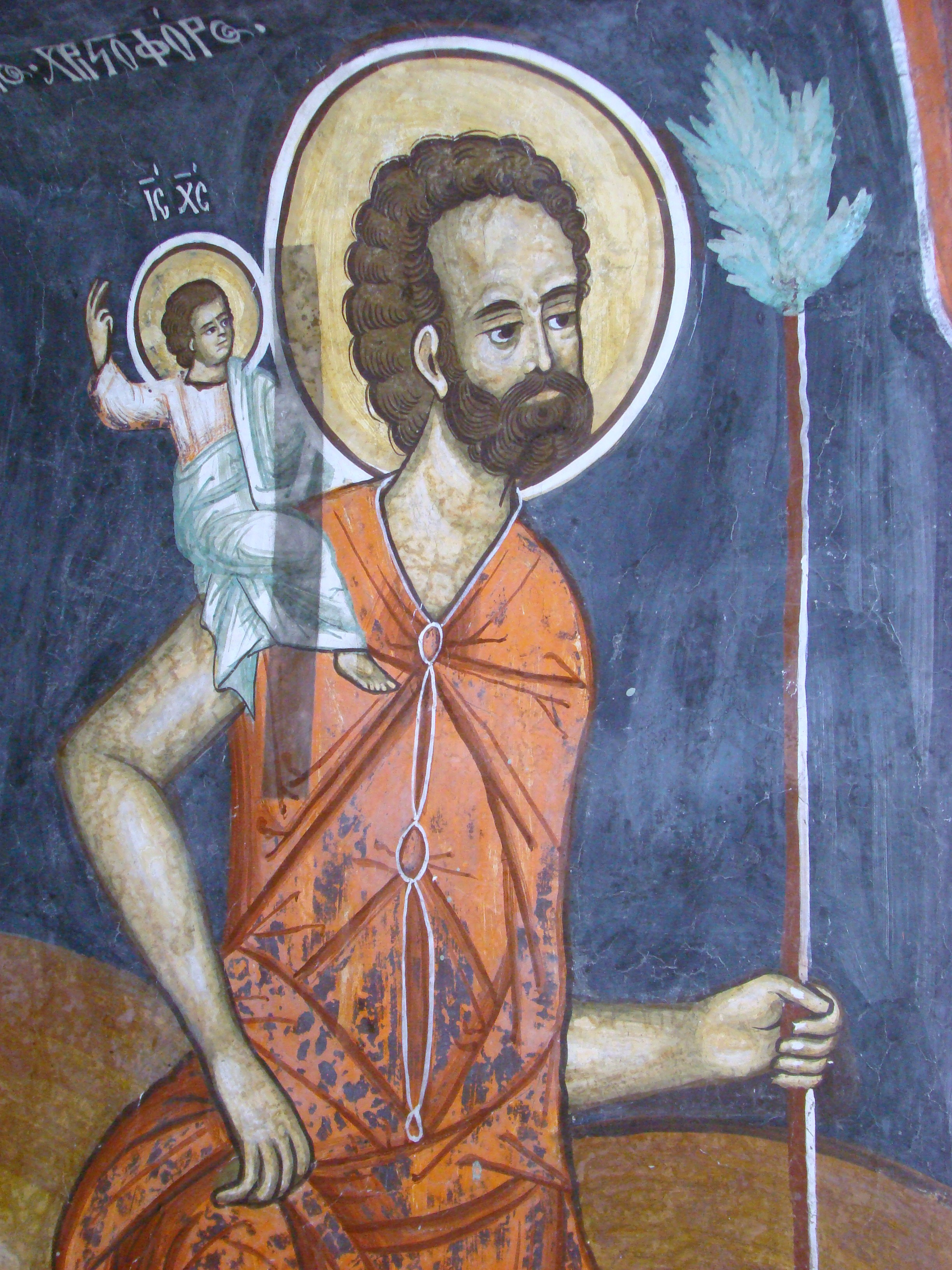
Great-martyr Christopher of Lycia.

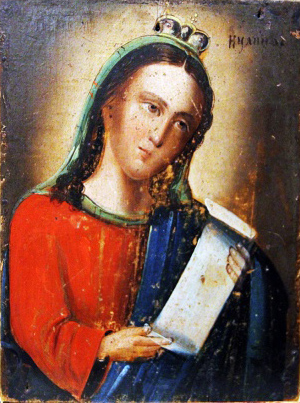
St. Aquilina.

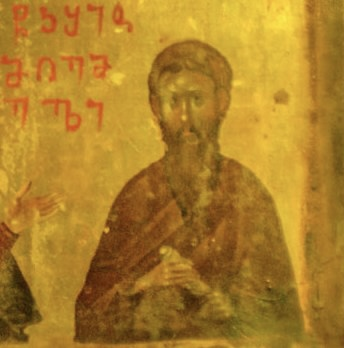
Saint Shio of Mgvime, monk, of Georgia.

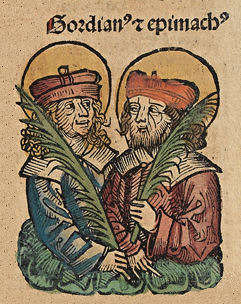
Sts. Gordianus and Epimachus (Illustration from the Nuremberg Chronicle).

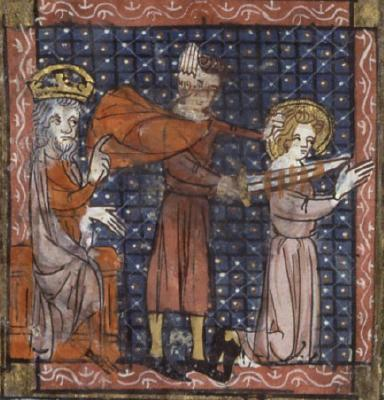
Martyrdom of St. Gordianus.

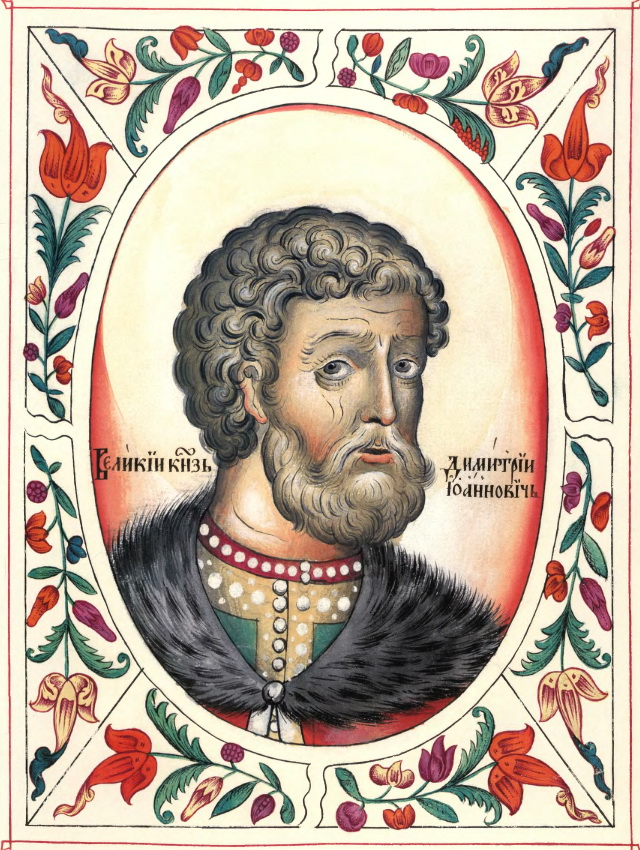
St. Dmitry Donskoy.

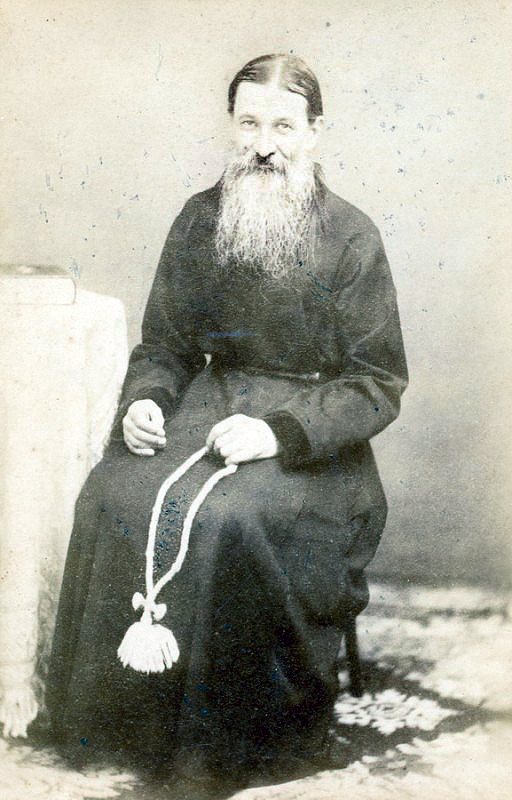
St. Joseph (Litovkin) of Optina.

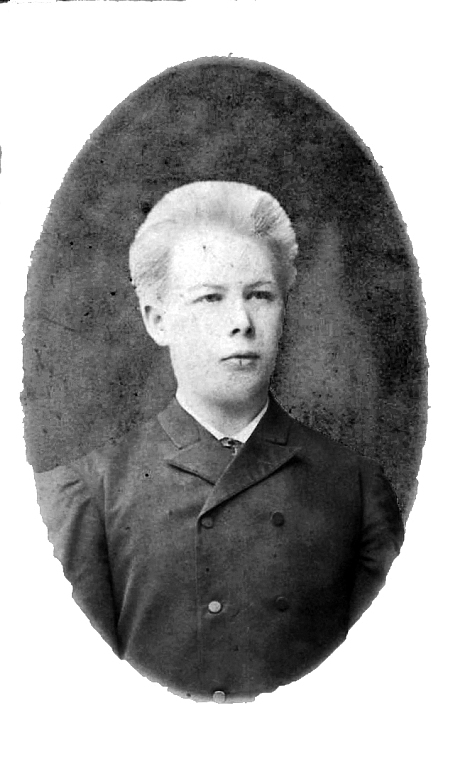
New Hieromartyr Dimitry Voskresensky.

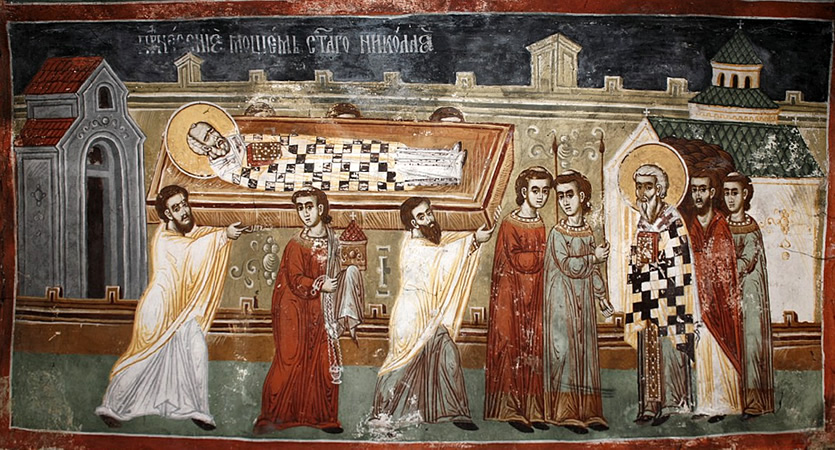
Translation of the Relics of Saint Nicholas from Myra to Bari.

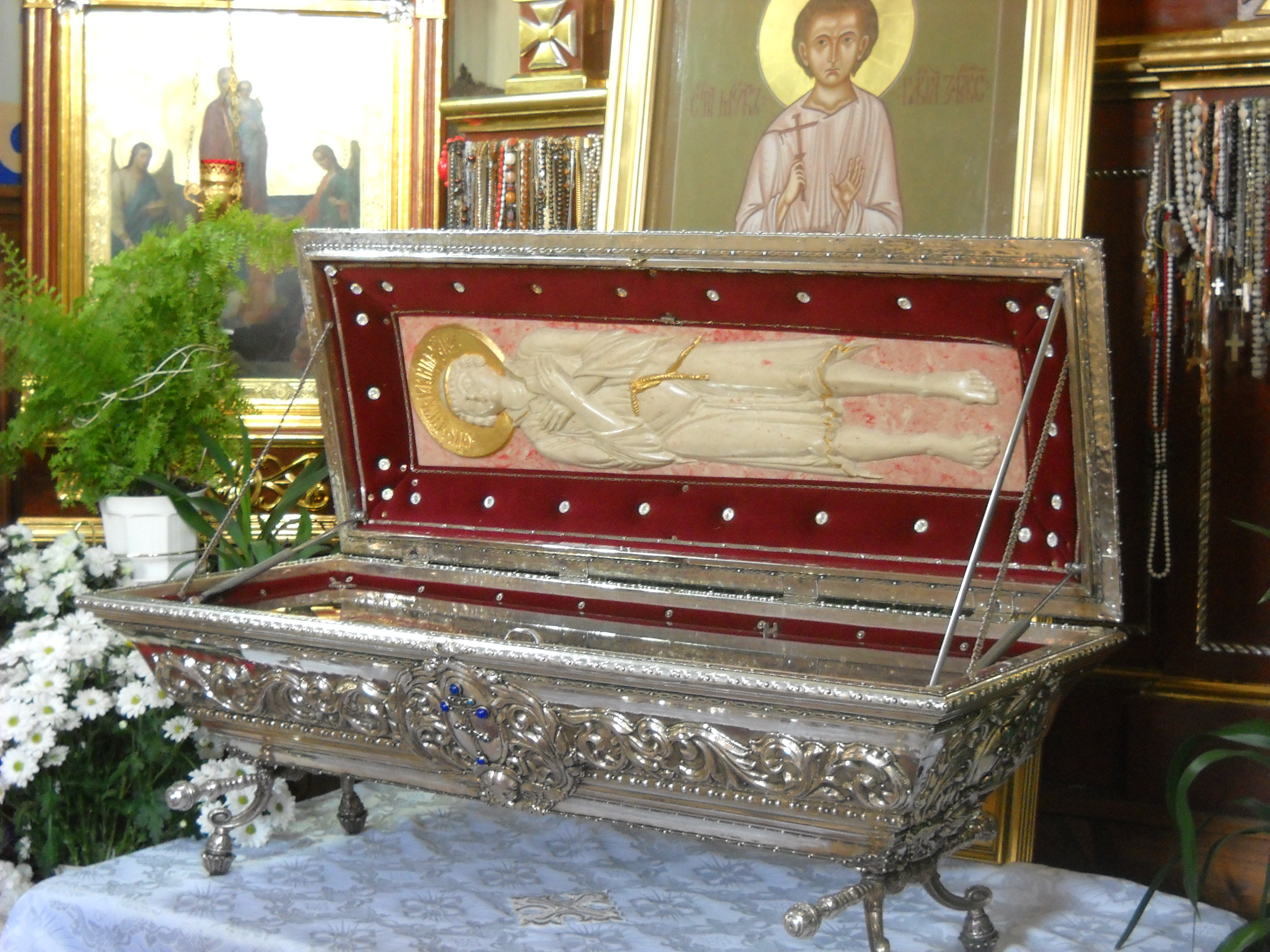
Reliquary of Child-martyr Gabriel of Slutsk, in the Cathedral of Białystok.

== Sources ==
- May 9/22. Orthodox Calendar (PRAVOSLAVIE.RU).
- May 22 / May 9, HOLY TRINITY RUSSIAN ORTHODOX CHURCH (A parish of the Patriarchate of Moscow)
- May 9. OCA - The Lives of the Saints.
- May 9. Latin Saints of the Orthodox Patriarchate of Rome.
- May 9. The Roman Martyrology.

Greek Sources

- Great Synaxaristes: (in Greek) 9 ΜΑΪΟΥ. ΜΕΓΑΣ ΣΥΝΑΞΑΡΙΣΤΗΣ.
- (in Greek) Συναξαριστής. 9 Μαΐου. ECCLESIA.GR. (H ΕΚΚΛΗΣΙΑ ΤΗΣ ΕΛΛΑΔΟΣ).

Russian Sources

- (in Russian) 22 мая (9 мая). Православная Энциклопедия под редакцией Патриарха Московского и всея Руси Кирилла (электронная версия). (Orthodox Encyclopedia – Pravenc.ru).
- (in Russian) 9 мая (ст.ст.) 22 мая 2013 (нов. ст.). Русская Православная Церковь Отдел внешних церковных связей. (DECR).
