= April 25 (Eastern Orthodox liturgics) =

Day in the Eastern Orthodox liturgical calendar

Eastern Orthodox liturgical calendar
April 24	April 25	April 26
April 25 O.S. ≍ May 8 N.S. April 25 N.S ≍ April 12 O.S.

An Eastern Orthodox cross

April 25 in Eastern Orthodox liturgical calendars is a feast day and a day of commemoration of saints and martyrs. Although some Orthodox churches use the Revised Julian Calendar and others use the traditional Julian calendar, the fixed commemorations for their respective April 25 are broadly the same, no matter which calendar is used. (Note: Despite the dates being the same, the days to which they refer typically differ by 13 days. The notation Old Style or O.S. is sometimes used to indicate a date in the traditional Julian Calendar (the "Old Calendar"). The notation New Style or N.S. indicates a date in the Revised Julian calendar (the "New Calendar").)

== Saints ==
- Holy Apostle and Evangelist Mark, first Bishop of Alexandria (63) (Note: "At Alexandria, the birthday of blessed Mark, evangelist, disciple and interpreter of the apostle St. Peter. He wrote his gospel at the request of the faithful of Rome, and taking it with him, proceeded to Egypt and founded a church at Alexandria, where he was the first to announce Christ. Afterwards, being arrested for the faith, he was bound, dragged over stones and endured great afflictions. Finally he was confined to prison, where, being comforted by the visit of an angel, and even by an apparition of our Lord himself, he was called to the heavenly kingdom in the eighth year of the reign of Nero.") (Note: Name days celebrated today include: Mark (Μᾶρκος).)
- Saint Anianas, second Bishop of Alexandria (86)
- Martyr Nike (Nice), by the sword (303)
- Hieromartyr Stephen II, Patriarch of Antioch (479) (Note: "At Antioch, St. Stephen, bishop and martyr, who suffered much from the heretics opposed to the Council of Chalcedon, and was precipitated into the river Orontes, in the time of the Emperor Zeno.")
- Saint Macedonius II, Patriarch of Constantinople (516)
- The Venebrable Eight Anchorites who were martyred by the sword.

== Pre-Schism Western saints ==
- Martyrs Evodius, Hermogenes and Callista, in Syracuse in Sicily.
- Saint Phaebadius (Fiari), a Bishop of Agen in the south of France, who succeeded in stamping out Arianism in Gaul, together with his friend St Hilary of Poitiers (c. 392) (Note: He was one of the best known bishops of his time and presided over several Councils.)
- Saint Maughold (Macaille), a disciple of Mel who became Bishop of Croghan in Offaly in Ireland, the patron saint of the Isle of Man (c. 489) (see also: April 27)
- Saint Rusticus, Archbishop of Lyon (501)
- Saint Erminus, a monk at Lobbes Abbey in Belgium and later Abbot, Bishop and Confessor (737)
- Saint Mella, the mother of two saints, Cannech and Tigernach, who became a nun and Abbess of Doire-Melle (Rossclogher Abbey), in County Leitrim (c. 780)
- Saint Heribaldus, Monk and abbot of the monastery of St Germanus in Auxerre in France and later bishop of the same city (c. 857)
- Saint Robert of Syracuse, Abbot of a monastery in Syracuse in Sicily (c. 1000)

== Post-Schism Orthodox saints ==
- Saint Sylvester of Obnorsk, Abbot of Obnora Monastery (1379)
- Venerable Basil, Elder of Poiana Mărului, Romania (1767)
- Venerable Bassian (Balashevich) the Blind, Hiero-schema-monk of the Kiev Caves (1827)

=== New martyrs and confessors ===
- Hieromartyr Sergius Rokhletsov, Protopresbyter, of Veliky Ustyug (1938)

== Other commemorations ==
- Commemoration of the Consecration of the Church of the all-praised Apostle Peter, located near the Cathedral of Hagia Sophia in Constantinople.
- Icon of the Mother of God of Constantinople (1071) (Note: The Constantinople Icon of the Theotokos is locally venerated at Moscow’s Dormition church on Malaya Dimitrovka. This image is different from the Constantinople Icon of the Most Holy Theotokos celebrated on September 17, although it appears to be a copy of it. The wonderworking Constantinople Icon appeared on April 25, 1071.)
- Repose of Elder Philotheus (Zervakos) of Paros (1980) (Note: On the morning of May 8, 1980, the blessed Elder Philotheos died in his cell at Thapsana, Paros. See also: (in Greek) Φιλόθεος Ζερβάκος. Βικιπαίδεια. Greek Wikipedia.)

== Icon gallery ==
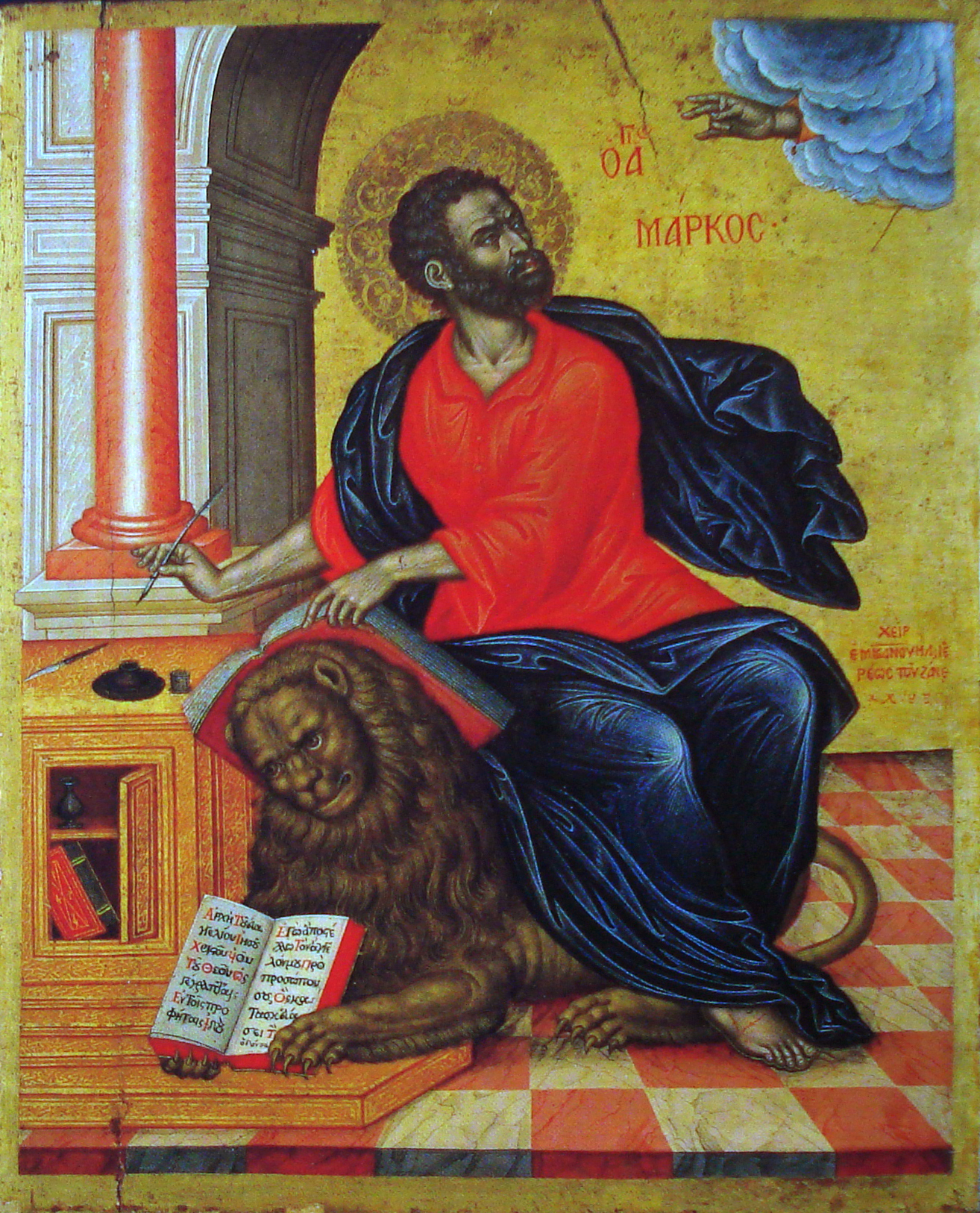
Holy Apostle and Evangelist Mark.

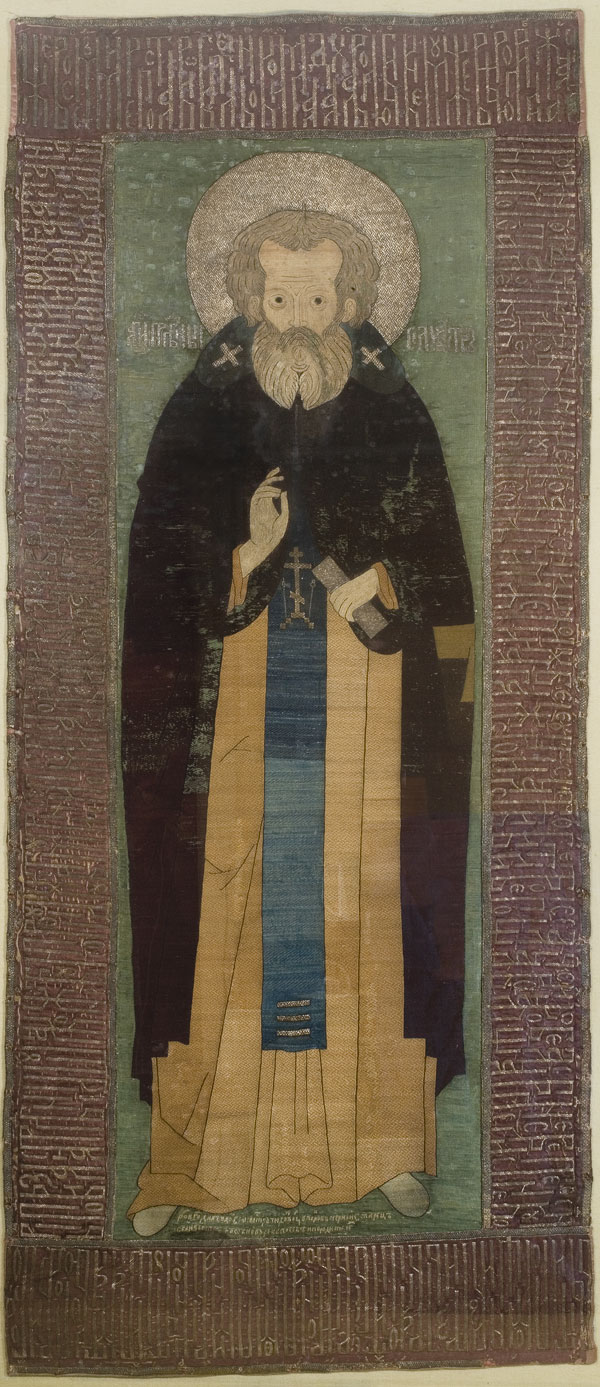
Saint Sylvester of Obnorsk.

== Sources ==
- April 25 / May 8. Orthodox Calendar (pravoslavie.ru).
- May 8 / April 25. Holy Trinity Russian Orthodox Church (A Parish of the Patriarchate of Moscow).
- April 25. OCA - The Lives of the Saints.
- The Autonomous Orthodox Metropolia of Western Europe and the Americas. St. Hilarion Calendar of Saints for the year of our Lord 2004. St. Hilarion Press (Austin, TX). p. 31.
- April 25. Latin Saints of the Orthodox Patriarchate of Rome.
- The Roman Martyrology. Transl. by the Archbishop of Baltimore. Last Edition, According to the Copy Printed at Rome in 1914. Revised Edition, with the Imprimatur of His Eminence Cardinal Gibbons. Baltimore: John Murphy Company, 1916. pp. 116–117.
- Rev. Richard Stanton. A Menology of England and Wales, or, Brief Memorials of the Ancient British and English Saints Arranged According to the Calendar, Together with the Martyrs of the 16th and 17th Centuries. London: Burns & Oates, 1892. p. 182.

Greek Sources

- Great Synaxaristes: (in Greek) 25 Απριλίου. Μεγασ Συναξαριστησ.
- (in Greek) Συναξαριστής. 25 Απριλίου. ecclesia.gr. (H Εκκλησια Τησ Ελλαδοσ).

Russian Sources

- (in Russian) 8 мая (25 апреля). Православная Энциклопедия под редакцией Патриарха Московского и всея Руси Кирилла (электронная версия). (Orthodox Encyclopedia - Pravenc.ru).
- (in Russian) 25 апреля (ст.ст.) 8 мая 2013 (нов. ст.). Русская Православная Церковь Отдел внешних церковных связей.
