= John I of Constantinople =

John I of Constantinople may refer to:

- John Chrysostom, saint and patriarch of Constantinople (347–407)
- John of Brienne, king of Jerusalem (1210–1225) and Latin emperor of Constantinople (1229–1237)

== See also ==
- John of Constantinople
