= Epimachus of Alexandria =

Roman martyr

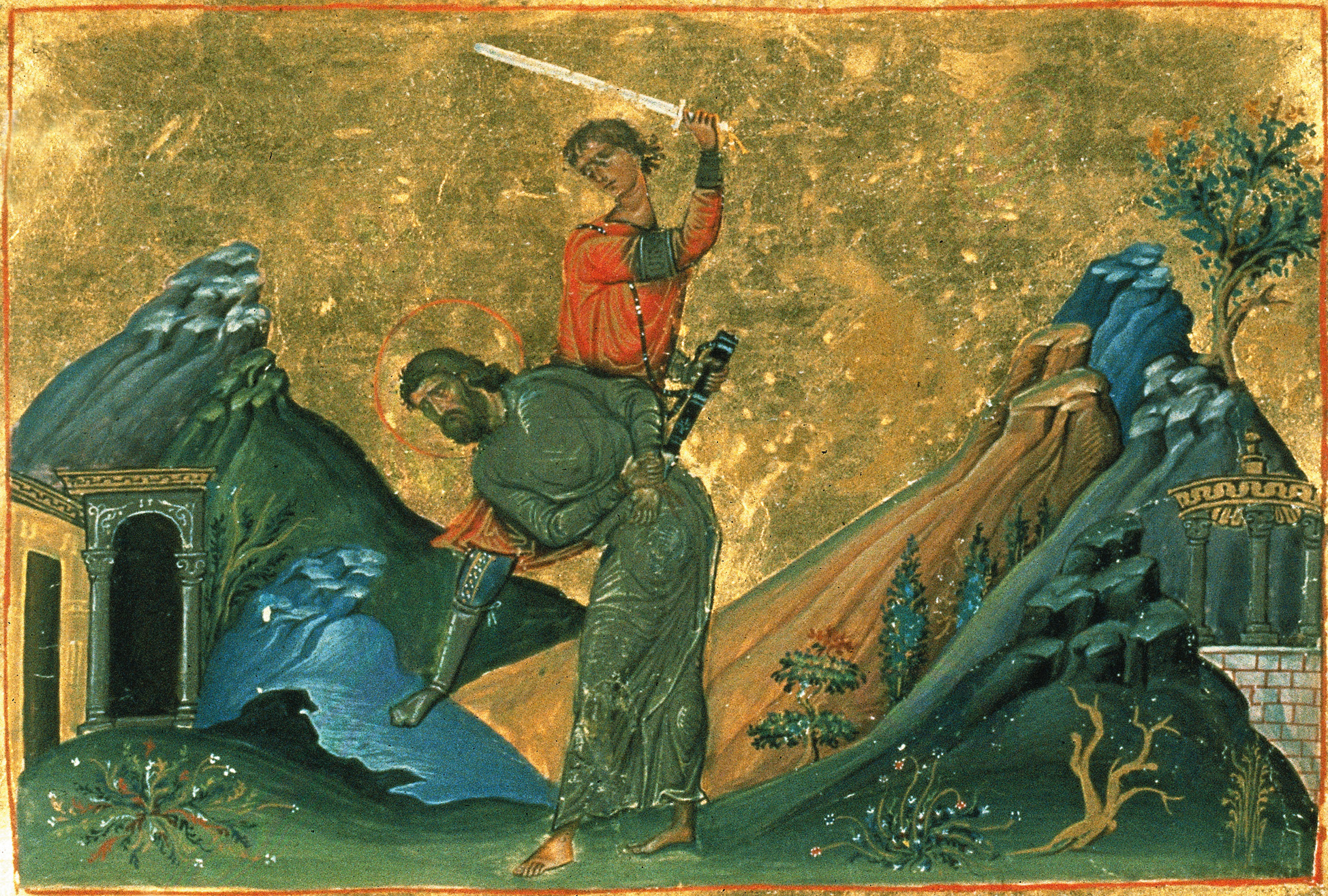
- Miniature from the Menologion of Basil II
- Died: 250 AD
- Venerated in: Catholic Church; Eastern Orthodox Church
- Feast: 12 December

Epimachus of Alexandria was a Roman martyr who died in 250 during the Decian persecution. He and his companions—Alexander, Ammonarion, Mercuria, Dionysia and other women—were beheaded at Alexandria. They are commemorated on 12 December.

After his martyrdom his body was laid in a crypt on the Via Latina and later the body of Saint Gordianus who was martyred during the time of Julian the Apostate was laid beside Epimachus. The two saints gave their name to the cemetery of Gordianus and Epimachus, and were for a long time jointly venerated by the Catholic Church on 10 May. This joint veneration was suppressed in 1969.

Many writers have denied the existence of an Epimachus martyred at Rome, and account for the relics honoured there by asserting that the body of a Saint Epimachus from Alexandria who was transported to Rome shortly before the martyrdom of St. Gordianus. The Bollandist Remi de Buck maintained that the evidence for the Roman Epimachus is too strong to be doubted, and denied that any relics of Epimachus of Alexandria came to Rome. According to others, the body of the Alexandrian Epimachus was translated to Constantinople.
