= Château de Saint-Paul-d'Oueil =

Castle in Haute-Garonne, France

- Saint-Paul-d'Oueil, Haute-Garonne, France in France
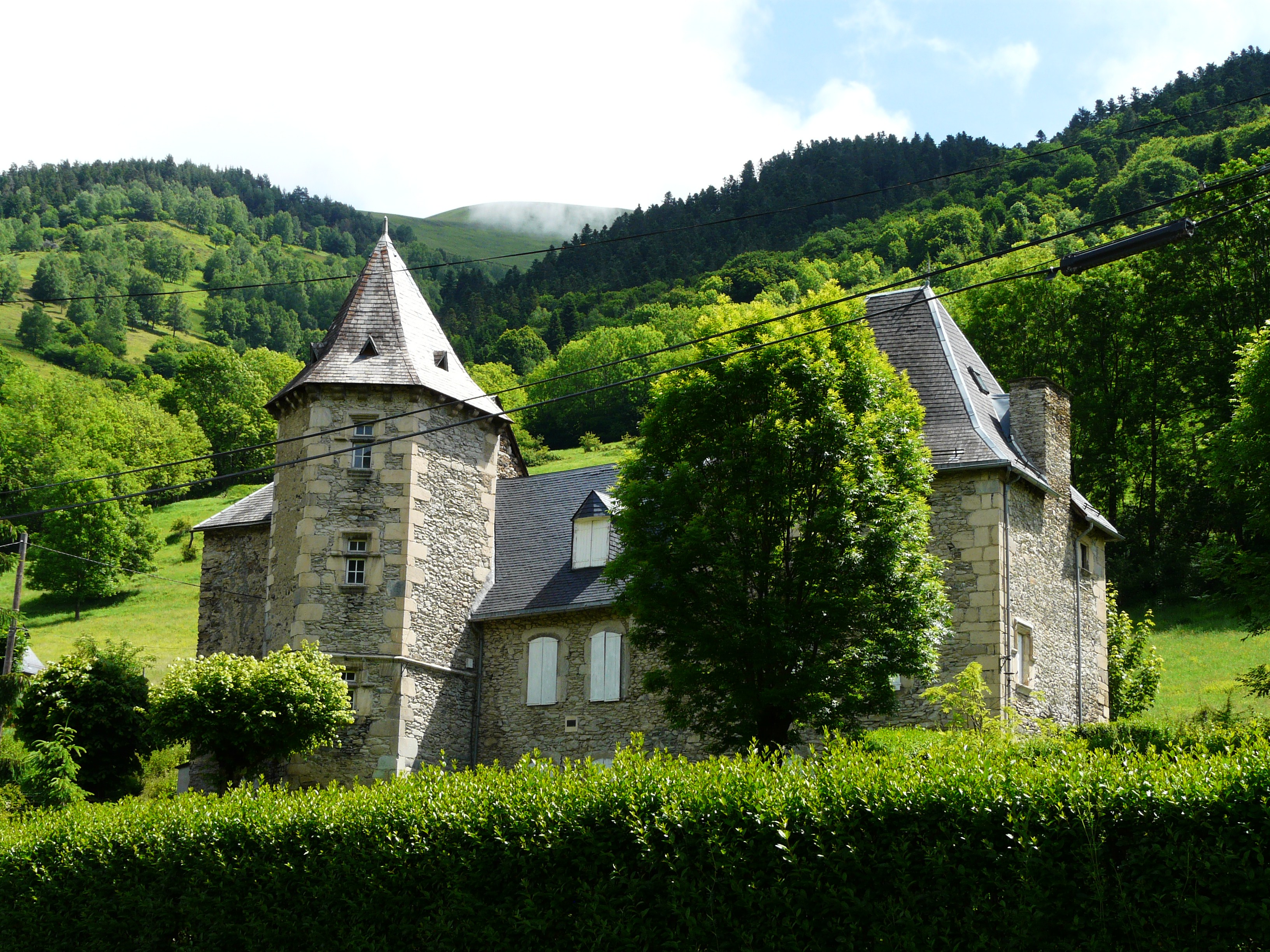
- View of the castle from the southwest, Haute-Garonne, France

Site information
- Type: Château
- Owner: Private
- Open to the public: No
- Condition: Preserved

Location
- Coordinates: 42°49′37″N 0°33′4″E

The Château de Saint-Paul-d'Oueil is a castle in the commune of Saint-Paul-d'Oueil in the Haute-Garonne département of France.

Privately owned, it has been listed since 1947 as a monument historique by the French Ministry of Culture.

== See also ==
- List of castles in France
