= Saint Gordianus =

Catholic saint (died 362)

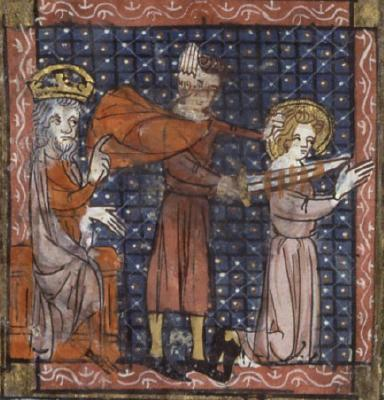
- The Martyrdom of Saint Gordian. French manuscript of the 14th century.
- Died: 362 AD
- Venerated in: Roman Catholic Church
- Feast: 10 May

Gordianus (died 362) was a Roman martyr who was killed during the reign of Julian the Apostate, and is commemorated on 10 May.

In his funeral inscription, Gordianus's youth is contrasted with his mature faith. Later Acts make him a pagan and a judge. He was charged with forcing Januarius to make a sacrifice to the Emperor, but instead was persuaded and then converted to Christianity with many within his household. Being accused before his successor, or as some say before the prefect of the city, Apronianus, he was tortured and finally beheaded. His body was carried off by the Christians, and laid in a crypt on the Latin Way beside the body of Epimachus of Alexandria, who had been recently interred there. The two saints gave their name to the cemetery, and have ever since been jointly venerated by the Catholic Church. According to David Farmer, these Acts are historically "worthless".

Some time later the remains of Gordianus were moved to the Cyriaca cemetery and there they lay until the 1670s, when a monk named Ambrose of the Order of St Augustin removed them and gave them to Christopher Anderson, a Jesuit priest. The remains were transferred to the Jesuit College of St. Omer; when the College moved to Stonyhurst, the remains travelled to England where they have remained since, interred below the altar of the Sodality Chapel. His bones were temporarily removed in 2006 whilst the chapel underwent restoration, but they have since been returned.

The Princely Abbey of Kempten in Bavaria was established in 752, and dedicated to the Virgin Mary and Gordianus and Epimachus. Some of the relics of the two saints were brought there.

There is a church dedicated to Gordianus in Saint-Paul-d'Oueil in France.
