= April 27 (Eastern Orthodox liturgics) =

Day in the Eastern Orthodox liturgical calendar

Eastern Orthodox liturgical calendar
April 26	April 27	April 28
April 27 O.S. ≍ May 10 N.S. April 27 N.S ≍ April 14 O.S.

An Eastern Orthodox cross

April 27 in Eastern Orthodox liturgical calendars is a feast day and a day of commemoration of saints and martyrs. Although some Orthodox churches use the Revised Julian Calendar and others use the traditional Julian calendar, the fixed commemorations for their respective April 27 are broadly the same, no matter which calendar is used. (Note: Despite the dates being the same, the days to which they refer typically differ by 13 days. The notation Old Style or O.S. is sometimes used to indicate a date in the traditional Julian Calendar (the "Old Calendar"). The notation New Style or N.S. indicates a date in the Revised Julian calendar (the "New Calendar").)

== Saints ==
- Saint Symeon the Kinsman of the Lord, Apostle of the Seventy and Hieromartyr (107)
- Martyr Publius (Poplion), by the sword.
- Martyr Lollion the Younger (Lollion the New).
- Saint Pollion the Reader (Pollio), of Cibalis in Pannonia, burnt alive under Diocletian (306)
- Saint Eulogius the Hospitable of Constantinople (6th century)
- Saint Nicon, abbot of the Monastery of St. Gerasimus (6th century)
- Saint Simeon Stylites the Younger of Cilicia (597), and his brother George.
- Saint John of Cathares, Abbot of Cathares Monastery at Constantinople (839) (Note: "At Constantinople, the abbot St. John, who combated vigorously for the worship of holy images, under Leo the Isaurian.")

== Pre-Schism Western saints ==
- Saint Liberalis of Treviso, priest from the area near Ancona in Italy who worked for the conversion of the Arians and suffered much at their hands (400)
- Saint Theophilus, Bishop of Brescia (427)
- Saint Maughold, Bishop of the Isle of Man (c. 488) (see also: April 25)
- Saint Assicus (Ascicus, Tassach), first bishop of Elphin, Ireland, converted to Christianity by Saint Patrick (490)
- Saint Tertullian, eighth Bishop of Bologna in Italy (490) (Note: "At Bologna, St. Tertullian, bishop and confessor.")
- Saint Enoder (Cynidr, Kenedr, Quidic) (6th century)
- Saint Winewald, Abbot of Beverley in England (c. 731) (Note: "WINEWALD succeeded St. Bercthun in the government of Beverley Abbey in the year 733, and. was greatly venerated for the sanctity of his life, having in some records the title of Saint prefixed to his name. He was called to his heavenly reward in the year 751, but the day of his deposition is not known.")
- Saint Floribert of Liège (746)

== Post-Schism Orthodox saints ==
- Saint Stephen, abbot of the Kiev Caves and Bishop of Vladimir in Volhynia (1094)
- New Hieromartyr Seraphim, Bishop of Phanarion and Neokhorion (1601)
- New Martyr Elias (Ardunis) of Mount Athos (1686)
- Saint Basil (Kishkin), Hieroschemamonk of Glinsk and Ploshchansk hermitages (1831)

=== New martyrs and confessors ===
- New Hieromartyrs Paul Svetozarov, Protopresbyter, and John Rozhdestvensky, Priest, and those with them: (1922)

- Martyrs Peter Yazykov, Nicholas Malkov, Auxentius Kalashnikov, Sergius Mefodiev and Virgin-martyr Anastasia of Shui and Palekh, at Ivanova.

- Virgin-martyr Mary Nosova (1938)
- New Hieromartyr John Spassky, priest of Tver (1941)

== Other commemorations ==
- Incineration of the relics of Saint Sabbas, first Archbishop of Serbia, by Sinan Pasha (1595)
- Apparition of Our Lady of Kazan in Aleksandrovka, Saint Petersburg Governorate (1826)
- Glorification (1999) of New Hieromartyr Hilarion (Troitsky), Archbishop of Verey (1929)

== Icon gallery ==
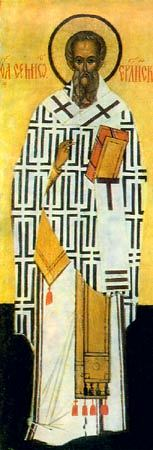
St. Symeon the Kinsman of the Lord.

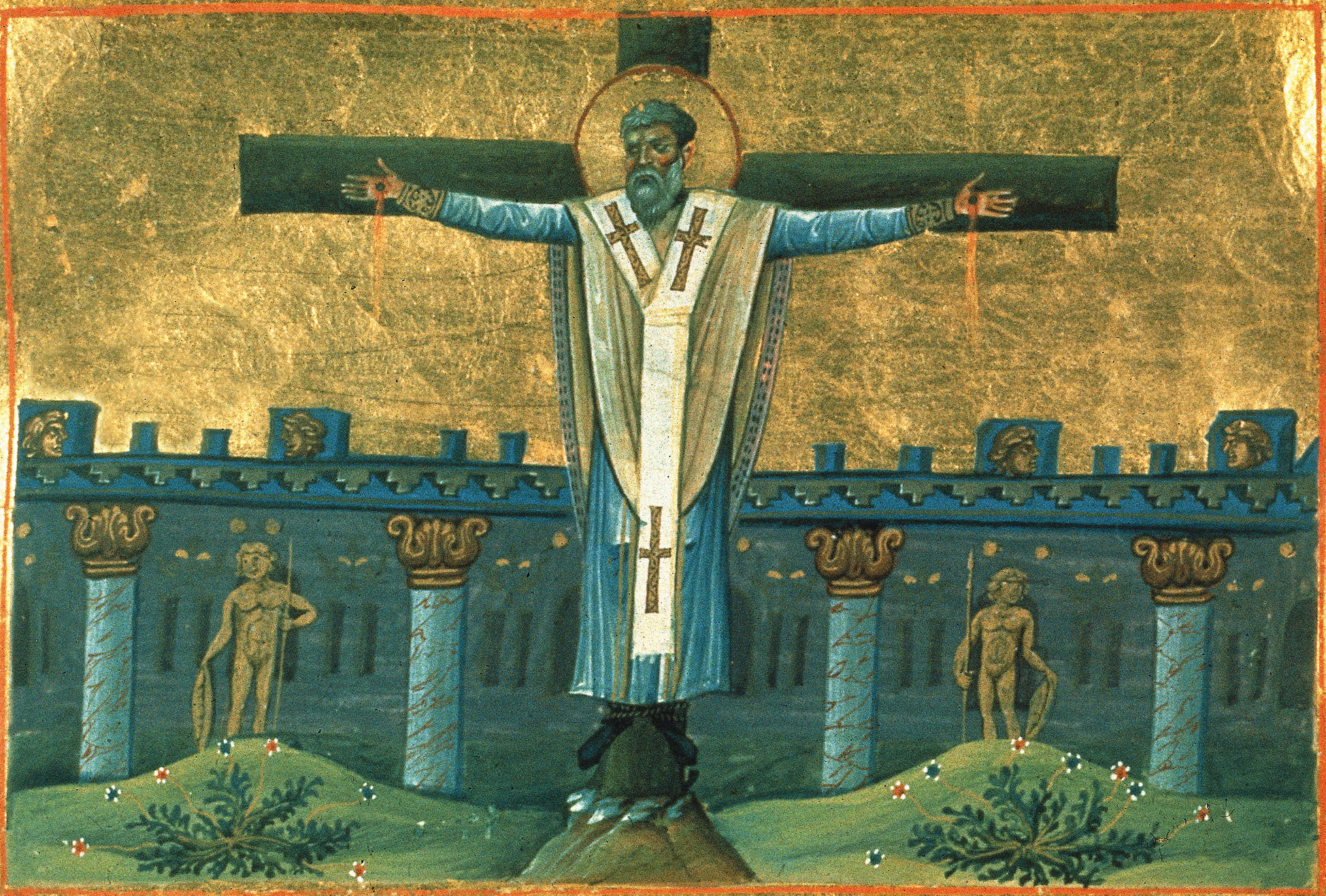
Martyrdom of St. Simeon (Menologion of Basil II, 10th century).

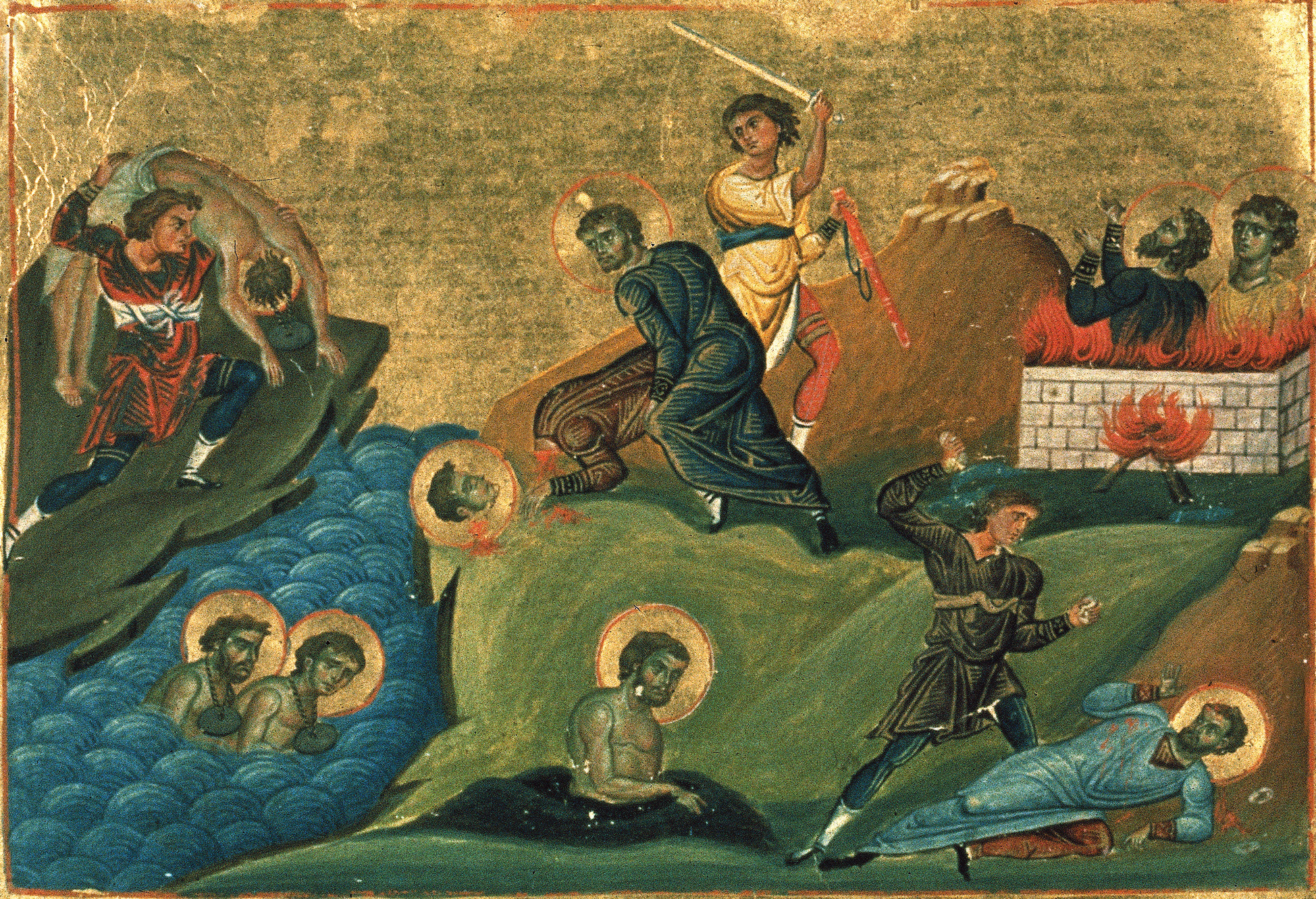
St. Anthimus of Nicomedia, (Menologion of Basil II, 10th century).

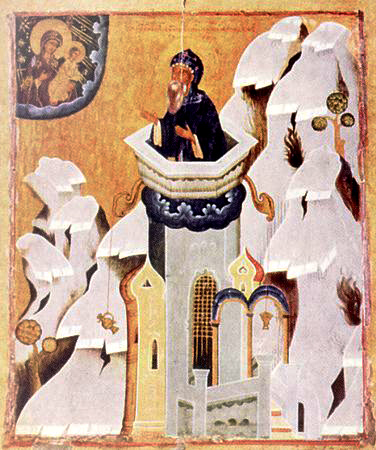
St. Simeon Stylites the Younger.

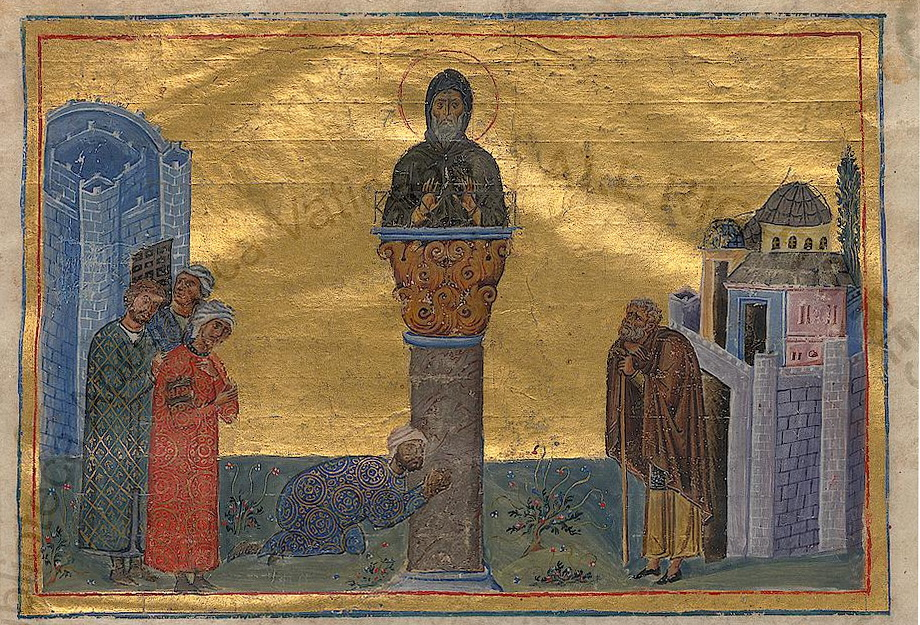
St. Simeon Stylites.

== Sources ==
- April 27/May 10. Orthodox Calendar (Pravoslavie.ru).
- May 10 / April 27. Holy Trinity Russian Orthodox Church (A parish of the Patriarchate of Moscow).
- April. Self-Ruled Antiochian Orthodox Christian Archdiocese of North America.
- April 27. OCA - The Lives of the Saints.
- April 27. Latin Saints of the Orthodox Patriarchate of Rome.
- The Roman Martyrology. Transl. by the Archbishop of Baltimore. Last Edition, According to the Copy Printed at Rome in 1914. Revised Edition, with the Imprimatur of His Eminence Cardinal Gibbons. Baltimore: John Murphy Company, 1916. p. 118.
- Rev. Richard Stanton. A Menology of England and Wales, or, Brief Memorials of the Ancient British and English Saints Arranged According to the Calendar, Together with the Martyrs of the 16th and 17th Centuries. London: Burns & Oates, 1892. p. 184.

Greek Sources

- Great Synaxaristes: (in Greek) 27 Απριλίου. Μέγας Συναξαριστής.
- (in Greek) Συναξαριστής. 27 Απριλίου. Ecclesia.gr. (H Εκκλησία της Ελλάδος).

Russian Sources

- (in Russian) 10 мая (27 апреля). Православная Энциклопедия под редакцией Патриарха Московского и всея Руси Кирилла (электронная версия). (Orthodox Encyclopedia - Pravenc.ru).
- (in Russian) 27 апреля (ст.ст.) 10 мая 2013 (нов. ст.). Русская Православная Церковь Отдел внешних церковных связей. (DECR).
