= Gordianus and Epimachus =

Catholic saints

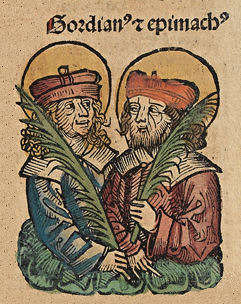
Gordianus and Epimachus depicted together in the Nuremberg Chronicle

Saint Gordianus and Saint Epimachus of Alexandria were jointly venerated in the Catholic Church on 10 May until 1969.

Epimachus died in 250 and Gordianus in 362. They allegedly came to be buried beside each other in the same crypt in Rome, giving their name to the cemetery of Gordianus and Epimachus. Charlemagne's queen, Hildegard, presented Kempten Abbey with some relics of the saints. Along with the Virgin Mary, Gordianus and Epimachus are venerated as the abbey's patrons. There are churches in Germany dedicated to the saints in: Aitrach, Legau, Merazhofen, Pleß, Stöttwang, and Unterroth, Germany; and also one in Blevio, Italy.
