= Sylvester of the River Obnora =

Russian hermit (died 1379)

Saint Sylvester of the River Obnora
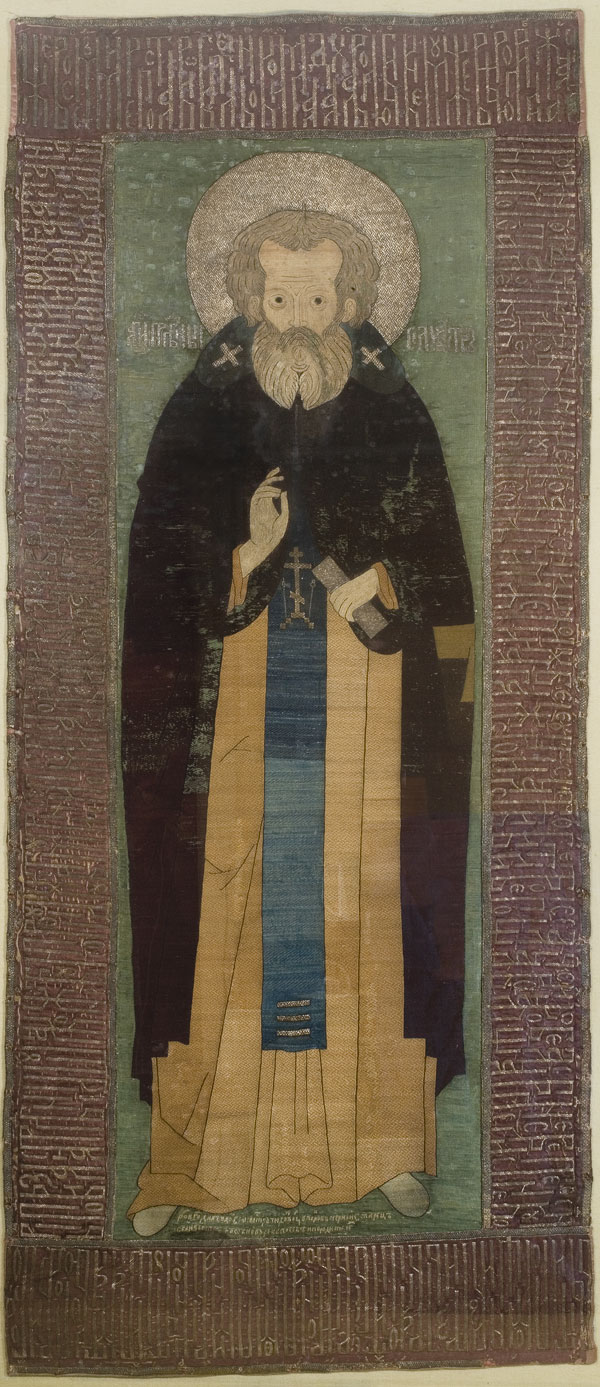
- 17th-century veil

The Venerable
- Died: 25 April 1379
- Feast: 8 May

Sylvester of the River Obnora (Russian: Сильвестр Обнорский, romanized: Silvestr Obnorsky; died 25 April 1379), also known as Sylvester of Obnorsk, was a Russian hermit. He was a disciple of Sergius of Radonezh. He was canonized as a saint by the Russian Orthodox Church. His feast day is on 8 May.

== Life ==
The Life (vita) of Sylvester has not survived. Surviving manuscripts from the 17th century contain basic information and later miracles.

Sylvester was inspired by the teachings of Sergius of Radonezh. He was trained at Trinity Monastery. Sylvester then went as a hermit to live along the banks of the river Obnora, living on either herbs or tree bark and roots. He nearly died but is said to have received sustenance from an angel that saved him. Later others joined him and he established a monastery.

== Sources ==
- Romanenko, Ye. V. (2021). "Сильвестр". Православная энциклопедия. Т. LXIII: Сергий — Синаксарь (in Russian). Moscow: Православная энциклопедия. pp. 340–347. ISBN 978-5-89572-069-1.
- Walsh, Michael. A New Dictionary of Saints. Liturgical Press, 2007. p. 567
