= Monoyer chart =

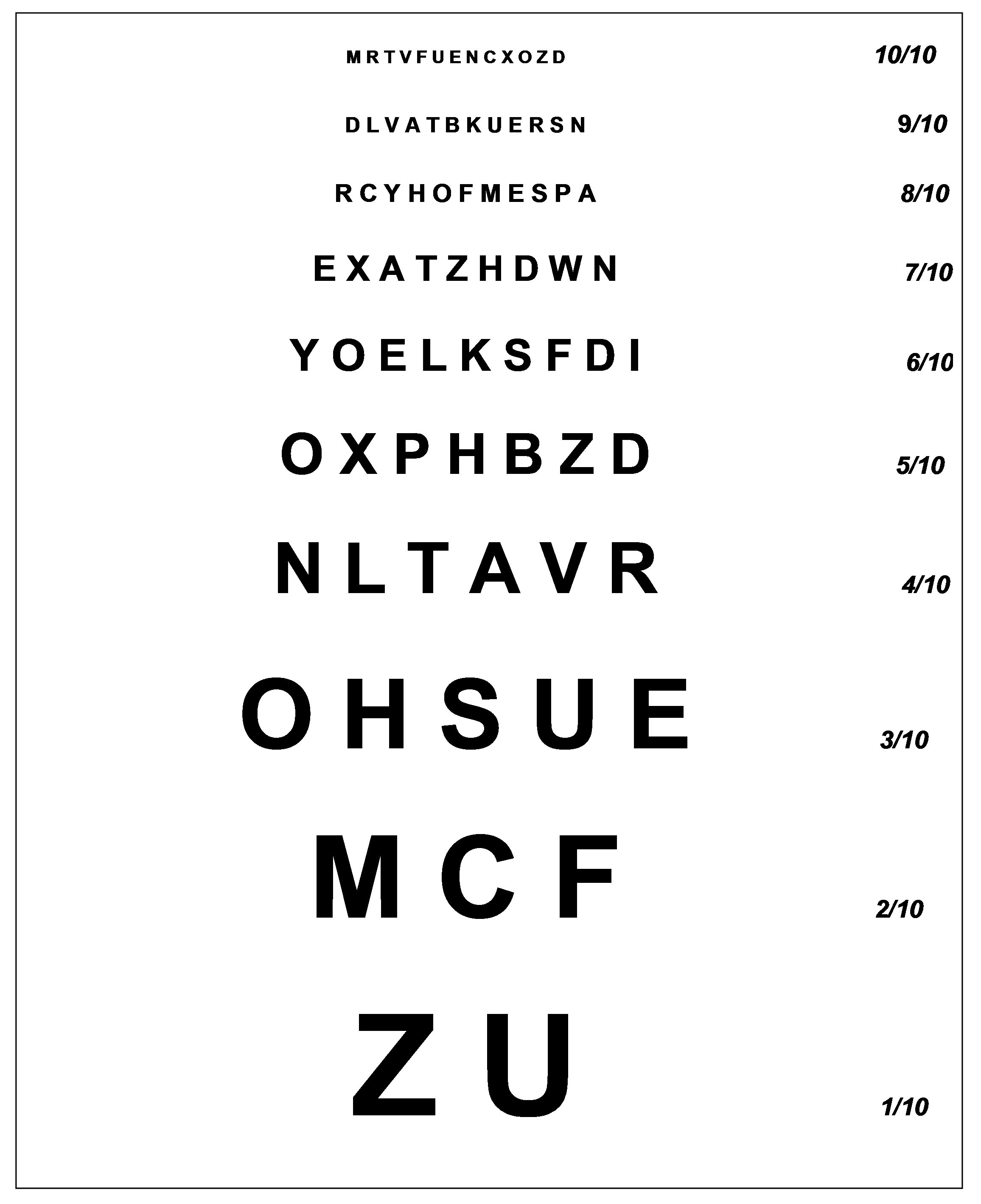
- Monoyer chart. Reading upwards on both ends, but ignoring the first line, the name "Ferdinand Monoyer" can be seen
- Purpose: test visual acuity

The Monoyer chart was created by Ferdinand Monoyer and is used to test visual acuity. He inserted his name in the chart; reading upwards on both ends, but ignoring the first line, the name "Ferdinand Monoyer" can be seen.

== See also ==
- Snellen chart
