= Saint-Paul-d'Oueil =

- Commune
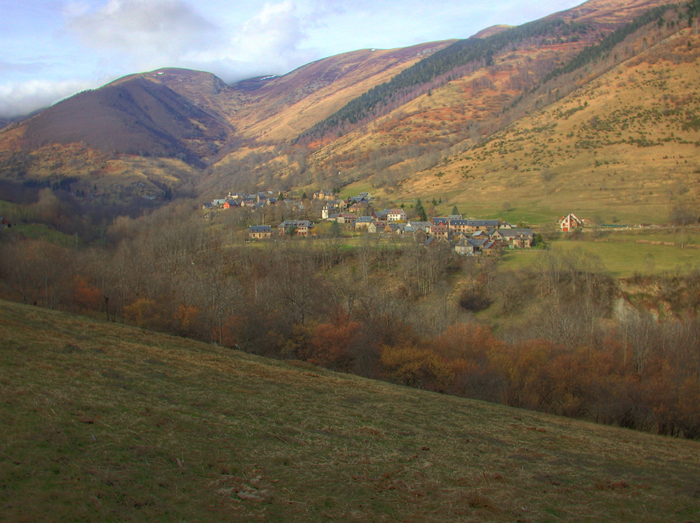
- A general view of Saint-Paul-d'Oueil
- Location of Saint-Paul-d'Oueil
- Location within France Location within Occitanie
- Coordinates: 42°49′36″N 0°33′07″E
- Country: France
- Region: Occitania
- Department: Haute-Garonne
- Arrondissement: Saint-Gaudens
- Canton: Bagnères-de-Luchon

Government
  - Mayor (2020–2026): Jean-Luc Redonnet
- Area^{1}: 7.46 km^{2} (2.88 sq mi)
- Elevation: 1,100 m (3,600 ft)
- Highest elevation: 1,988 m (6,522 ft)
- Lowest elevation: 1,031 m (3,383 ft)
- Population (2023): 46
  - Density: 6.2/km^{2} (16/sq mi)
- Time zone: UTC+01:00 (CET)
  - Summer (DST): UTC+02:00 (CEST)
- INSEE/Postal code: 31508 /31110
- ^{1} French Land Register data, which excludes lakes, ponds, glaciers > 1 km^{2} (0.386 sq mi or 247 acres) and river estuaries.

Saint-Paul-d'Oueil (French pronunciation: [sɛ̃ pɔl dwɛj]; Gascon: Sent Pau d'Oelh) is a commune in the Haute-Garonne department in southwestern France.

== Geography ==
=== Climate ===
Saint-Paul-d'Oueil has an oceanic climate (Köppen climate classification Cfb). The average annual temperature in Saint-Paul-d'Oueil is 9.8 °C (49.6 °F). The average annual rainfall is 989.6 mm (38.96 in) with May as the wettest month. The temperatures are highest on average in August, at around 17.0 °C (62.6 °F), and lowest in January, at around 3.2 °C (37.8 °F). The highest temperature ever recorded in Saint-Paul-d'Oueil was 37.5 °C (99.5 °F) on 18 August 2012; the coldest temperature ever recorded was −16.6 °C (2.1 °F) on 8 February 2012.

Climate data for Saint-Paul-d'Oueil (1981−2010 normals, extremes 1999−2020)
Month	Jan	Feb	Mar	Apr	May	Jun	Jul	Aug	Sep	Oct	Nov	Dec	Year
Record high °C (°F)	21.8 (71.2)	24.5 (76.1)	24.2 (75.6)	26.5 (79.7)	31.2 (88.2)	36.4 (97.5)	36.0 (96.8)	37.5 (99.5)	34.7 (94.5)	28.8 (83.8)	25.1 (77.2)	23.0 (73.4)	37.5 (99.5)
Mean daily maximum °C (°F)	7.7 (45.9)	8.3 (46.9)	11.7 (53.1)	13.2 (55.8)	16.8 (62.2)	21.3 (70.3)	22.5 (72.5)	22.7 (72.9)	19.9 (67.8)	16.8 (62.2)	10.3 (50.5)	7.8 (46.0)	15.0 (59.0)
Daily mean °C (°F)	3.2 (37.8)	3.4 (38.1)	6.2 (43.2)	7.9 (46.2)	11.5 (52.7)	15.5 (59.9)	16.9 (62.4)	17.0 (62.6)	14.2 (57.6)	11.5 (52.7)	5.8 (42.4)	3.5 (38.3)	9.8 (49.6)
Mean daily minimum °C (°F)	−1.3 (29.7)	−1.6 (29.1)	0.7 (33.3)	2.6 (36.7)	6.2 (43.2)	9.8 (49.6)	11.2 (52.2)	11.3 (52.3)	8.5 (47.3)	6.2 (43.2)	1.2 (34.2)	−0.9 (30.4)	4.5 (40.1)
Record low °C (°F)	−13.9 (7.0)	−16.6 (2.1)	−12.0 (10.4)	−6.1 (21.0)	−3.9 (25.0)	0.6 (33.1)	3.6 (38.5)	4.7 (40.5)	−0.6 (30.9)	−6.0 (21.2)	−10.5 (13.1)	−11.5 (11.3)	−16.6 (2.1)
Average precipitation mm (inches)	95.7 (3.77)	58.6 (2.31)	81.3 (3.20)	104.8 (4.13)	115.0 (4.53)	82.1 (3.23)	76.7 (3.02)	64.2 (2.53)	63.7 (2.51)	68.6 (2.70)	105.3 (4.15)	73.6 (2.90)	989.6 (38.96)
Average precipitation days (≥ 1.0 mm)	9.8	8.2	10.4	12.5	12.7	10.9	9.2	10.0	8.3	10.3	11.2	9.5	122.9
Source: Météo-France

== Population ==
Historical population
Year	Pop.	±% p.a.
1968	44	—
1975	42	−0.66%
1982	30	−4.69%
1990	44	+4.90%
1999	49	+1.20%
2007	53	+0.99%
2012	44	−3.65%
2017	34	−5.03%
2023	46	+5.17%
Source: INSEE

== Sights ==
The Château de Saint-Paul-d'Oueil is a 16th-century castle which is listed as a historic site by the French Ministry of Culture.

== See also ==
- Communes of the Haute-Garonne department
