= May 8 (Eastern Orthodox liturgics) =

Day in the Eastern Orthodox liturgical calendar

Eastern Orthodox liturgical calendar
May 7	May 8	May 9
May 8 O.S. ≍ May 21 N.S. May 8 N.S ≍ April 25 O.S.

An Eastern Orthodox cross

May 8 in Eastern Orthodox liturgical calendars is a feast day and a day of commemoration of saints and martyrs. Although some Orthodox churches use the Revised Julian Calendar and others use the traditional Julian calendar, the fixed commemorations for their respective May 8 are broadly the same, no matter which calendar is used. (Note: Despite the dates being the same, the days to which they refer typically differ by 13 days. The notation Old Style or O.S. is sometimes used to indicate a date in the traditional Julian Calendar (the "Old Calendar"). The notation New Style or N.S. indicates a date in the Revised Julian calendar (the "New Calendar").)

== Saints ==
- Holy Apostle and Evangelist John the Theologian, the "beloved disciple" of the Lord (c. 101) (Note: "His popularity in Ukraine and elsewhere was due to his Gospel and the belief that he was taken bodily into heaven upon his repose. On this day, worshippers at the site of his tomb at Ephesus are enveloped with bright particles that rise in the air as a result of a gentle breeze and these particles are miracle-working. On the island of Patmos where St John wrote the Book of Revelation, there is enshrined the Kozak martyr, St Pachomius.")
- The holy group of Soldier Martyrs.
- Saint Augustina the Martyr, in Byzantium.
- Saint Agathius of Byzantium (Acacius) (303)
- Saint Emilia (375), mother of saints Macrina, Basil the Great, Naucratius, Peter of Sebaste, and Gregory of Nyssa.
- Saint Arsenius the Great, of Scetis (448)
- Saint Hierax (Ierakos) of Egypt (5th century)
- Saint Milles the Melodist (hymnographer), monk.

== Pre-Schism Western saints ==
- Hieromartyr Dionysius of Vienne (193)
- Martyr Victor of Milan (Victor the Moor, Victor Maurus) (c. 303)
- Saint Helladius of Auxerre (387)
- Saint Gybrian (Gobrian) of Ireland, Priest (509)
- Saint Desideratus, successor of St Arcadius as Bishop of Bourges, in France (550)
- Saint Iduberga (Itta), foundress of Nivelles Abbey, Belgium (652)
- Saint Benedict II, Pope of Rome (685)
- Hieromartyr Indract of Glastonbury, and his companions at Shapwick (c. 7th or 8th century) (Note: "In the Martyrology of Salisbury, the festival of these saints has been placed, at the 8th of May. This account is further sustained, by the authority of the Tallagh and Altempsian Martyrologies, as the Bollandists remark, at the same date. Already have we given their Acts, at the 5th of February; which seems to be recognised, as the chief day for their commemoration. At the 8th of May, Richard Whitford places the Festival of St. Indract, a King of Ireland, who abdicated his kingdom, and who is said to have set out with his sister St. Dominica, and with various other companions, who all suffered martyrdom.") (see also: February 5)
- Saints Wiro, Bishop of Utrecht (710), and Plechelm (730), missionary bishops, and Hierodeacon Otger (8th century), in the Maas Valley at Limburg.
- Saint Macarius of Ghent, Archbishop (1012)

== Post-Schism Orthodox saints ==
- Saint Pimen the Faster, of the Far Caves in Kiev (c. 1141) (Note: See: (in Russian) Пимен Постник (в Ближних пещерах). Википедии. (Russian Wikipedia).)
- Venarable Cassian, recluse and faster of the Kiev Caves (13th-14th centuries)
- Saint Arsenius the Lover of Labor, of the Kiev Caves (14th century) (Note: See: (in Russian) Арсений Трудолюбивый. Википедии. (Russian Wikipedia).)
- Saints Zosima and Adrian of Volokolamsk, founders of the Sestrinsk monastery on the banks of the River Sestra (15th-16th centuries)
- Holy Georgian Martyrs of Persia (17th-18th centuries)

=== New martyrs and confessors ===
- Martyr Nicephorus Zaitsev (1942)

== Other commemorations ==
- Commemoration of the miraculous healing of blinded Stephen by the Icon of the Most Holy Theotokos of Cassiopia, Corfu (1530)
- Translation of the relics (1785) of St. Arsenius of Novgorod, Fool-for-Christ (1570)
- Repose of Hiero-schemamonk Michael of Valaam, Confessor for the Orthodox Calendar (1934) (Note: (Elder Michael I The Confessor, 1871-1934). An outstanding monastery spiritual director and a leading father during the height of Valaam's blossoming. Elder Michael showed his integrity and genuineness when trouble struck in the twenties, with the forced installation of the Western secular calendar into Church life, which had not changed since ancient Byzantine times. He became a stalwart confessor of ecclesiastical firmness to the end and died as a hero in battle after being tormented by years of banishment, exile and mockery. Fr. Michael came to Valaam at a young age and his two brothers followed him, one a poet, and the other a musician, and they became outstanding monks. After visiting the Holy Land, Mt. Athos, Optina, and other centers of living Orthodoxy, Fr. Michael was able to widen his spiritual vision. He became a God bearing Elder and enabled his monks to be zealots for Orthodoxy at a time when apostasy began to encroach upon the Orthodox Church from within. In this sense, he became a carrier of the apostolic gift of Prophecy as is spoken of by St. Paul. A man ahead of his time, he is a guiding light for us and for Russia today.)

== Icon gallery ==
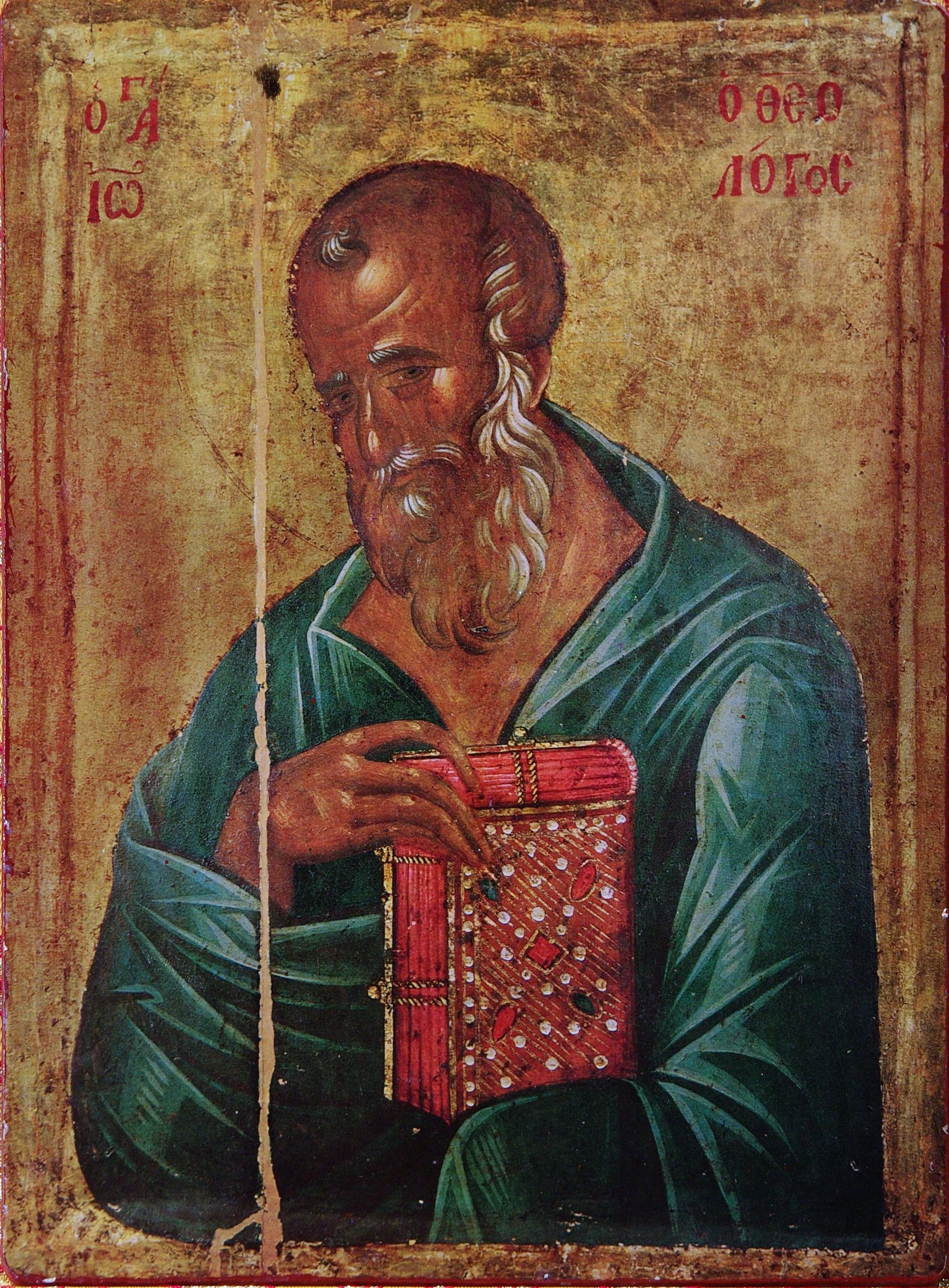
St. John the Theologian, the "beloved disciple" of the Lord.

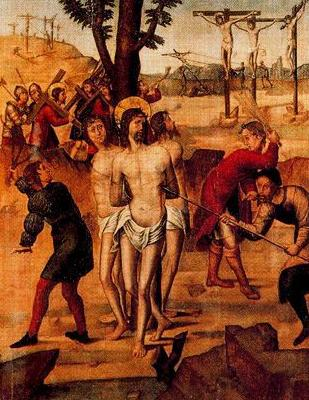
St. Agathius (Acacius of Byzantium).

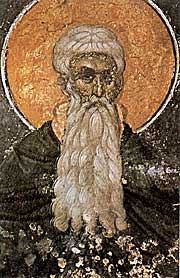
St. Arsenius the Great.

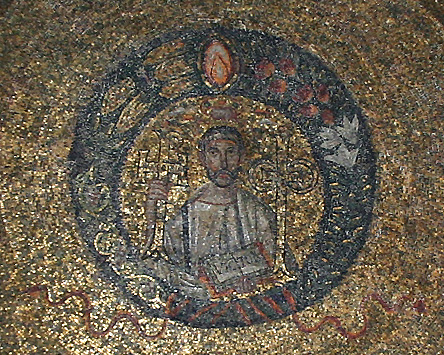
St. Victor of Milan (Victor the Moor, Victor Maurus).

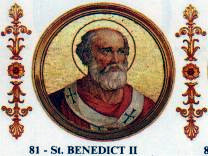
St. Benedict II, Pope of Rome.

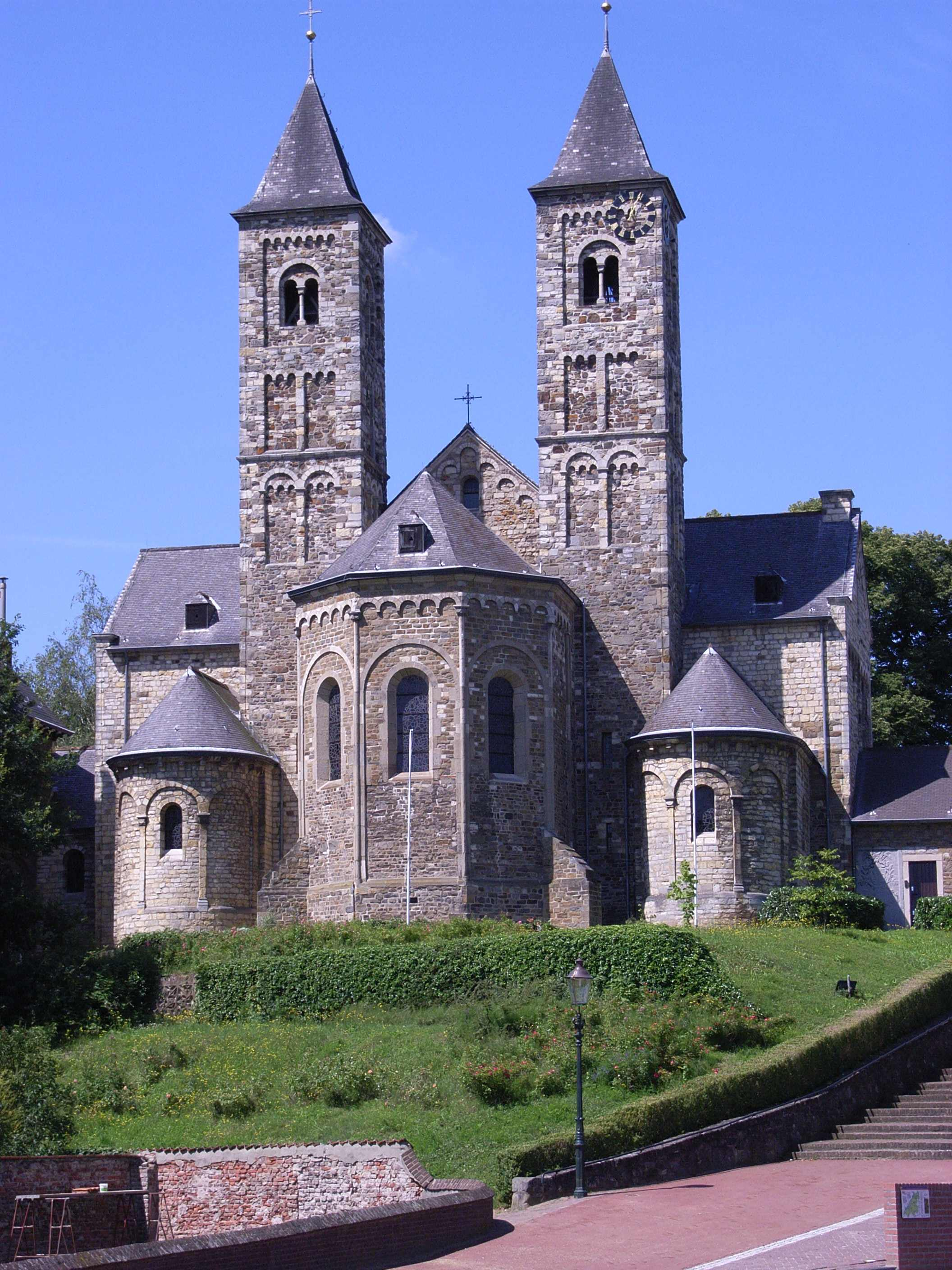
Basilica of Sts. Wiro, Plechelmus and Otgerus, at Sint Odiliënberg.

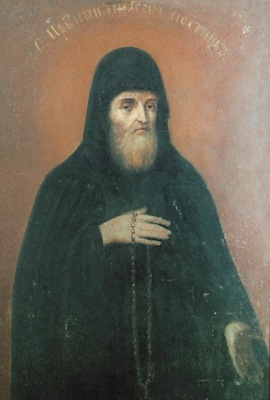
St. Pimen the Faster, of the Far Caves in Kiev.

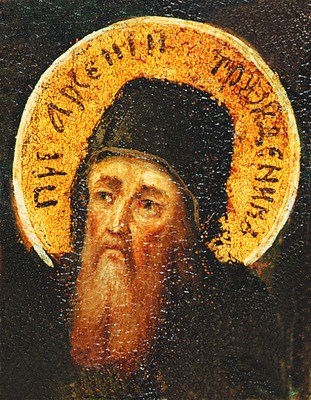
Saint Arsenius the Lover of Labor, of the Kiev Caves.

== Sources ==
- May 8/21. Orthodox Calendar (PRAVOSLAVIE.RU).
- May 21 / May 8. HOLY TRINITY RUSSIAN ORTHODOX CHURCH (A parish of the Patriarchate of Moscow).
- May 8. OCA - The Lives of the Saints.
- May 8. Latin Saints of the Orthodox Patriarchate of Rome.
- May 8. The Roman Martyrology.

Greek Sources

- Great Synaxaristes: (in Greek) 8 ΜΑΪΟΥ, ΜΕΓΑΣ ΣΥΝΑΞΑΡΙΣΤΗΣ.
- (in Greek) Συναξαριστής. 8 Μαΐου. ECCLESIA.GR. (H ΕΚΚΛΗΣΙΑ ΤΗΣ ΕΛΛΑΔΟΣ).

Russian Sources

- (in Russian) 21 мая (8 мая). Православная Энциклопедия под редакцией Патриарха Московского и всея Руси Кирилла (электронная версия). (Orthodox Encyclopedia - Pravenc.ru).
- (in Russian) 8 мая (ст.ст.) 21 мая 2013 (нов. ст.). Русская Православная Церковь Отдел внешних церковных связей. (DECR).
