= Catacomb of Santi Gordiano ed Epimaco =

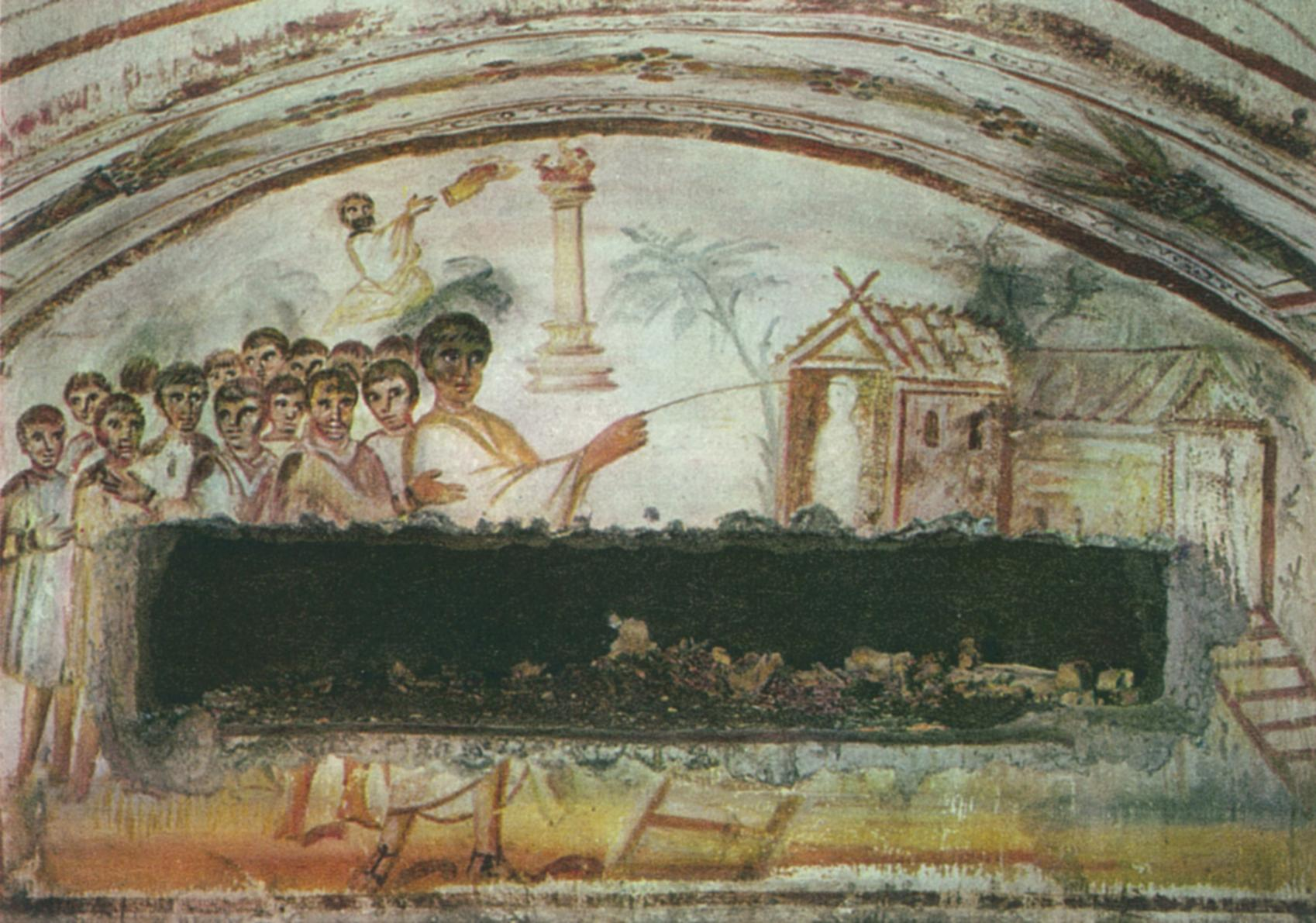
The Resurrection of Lazarus from Cubiculum O in the Catacomb.

The Catacomb of Santi Gordiano e Epimaco is a catacomb on the ancient via Latina in Rome, near the Aurelian Wall and piazza Galeria in the Appio-Latino quarter. Only some of its galleries have been found and excavated - archaeologists believe it to be a much larger necropolis on several levels, with inscriptions from Julian's reign showing it to have still been in use at that date.

== Details ==
It is named after Gordianus and Epimachus, two of the four martyrs stated to be buried there by the ancient literary sources (nothing is known about the lives of the others, Quartus and Quintus), all martyred on 10 May in different years according to the Martyrologium Hieronymianum. The 7th century Notitia ecclesiarum urbis Romae confirms all four were buried there and adds a fifth saint, Trophimus. Other itineraries add yet more martyrs buried there - Sophia, Sulpicius and Servilian, though evidence on these three is confused and fragmentary. High Medieval itineraries mention an above-ground basilica on the site, dedicated to Gordianus and Epimachus, and a mausoleum dedicated to Trophimus, but no remains of either of these two monuments have been found.

It was rediscovered by Enrico Josi in 1940-1941 and initially named the Catacomb of the Acqua Mariana, since Josi did not recognise it as the catacomb of Gordianus and Epimachus. Further excavations of a semi-demolished building on the surface in 1955 found a square frescoed cubiculum with three arcosolia, now known as cubiculum D, which was saved from destruction by priest-archaeologist Antonio Ferrua, then director of the Pontificia Commissione di Archeologia Sacra, and contains 350-400 AD frescoes of a seated Christ in majesty flanked by two figures holding the crown of martyrdom (thought to be Gordianus and Epimachus). Other frescoes in the rest of the complex show Moses receiving the tablets of the law, the resurrection of Lazarus, the fall of man and Susanna and the Elders.

== Bibliography (in Italian) ==
- De Santis L. - Biamonte G., Le catacombe di Roma, Newton & Compton Editori, Roma 1997, 271-274
- Ferrua A., Un nuovo cubicolo dipinto della via Latina, in Rendiconti della Pontificia Accademia Romana di Archeologia 45 (1972-73) 171-187
- Josi E., Di un nuovo cimitero sulla via Latina, in Rivista di Archeologia Cristiana 16 (1939) 197-2003, 17 (1940) 31-39 e 20 (1943) 9-45
