= April 26 (Eastern Orthodox liturgics) =

Day in the Eastern Orthodox liturgical calendar

Eastern Orthodox liturgical calendar
April 25	April 26	April 27
April 26 O.S. ≍ May 9 N.S. April 26 N.S ≍ April 13 O.S.

An Eastern Orthodox cross

April 26 in Eastern Orthodox liturgical calendars is a feast day and a day of commemoration of saints and martyrs. Although some Orthodox churches use the Revised Julian Calendar and others use the traditional Julian calendar, the fixed commemorations for their respective April 26 are broadly the same, no matter which calendar is used. (Note: Despite the dates being the same, the days to which they refer typically differ by 13 days. The notation Old Style or O.S. is sometimes used to indicate a date in the traditional Julian Calendar (the "Old Calendar"). The notation New Style or N.S. indicates a date in the Revised Julian calendar (the "New Calendar").)

== Saints ==
- Martyrs Cyril, Chindeu, and Tasie of Axiopolis (c. 304)
- Righteous Virgin-martyr Glaphyra of Nicomedia (322)
- Hieromartyr Basil of Amasea, Bishop of Amasea (c. 323) (Note: "At Amasea, in Pontus, St. Basileus, bishop and martyr, whose illustrious martyrdom occurred under the emperor Licinius. His body was thrown into the sea; but being found by Elpidiphorus, through the revelation of an angel, it was honorably entombed.")
- Saints Andrew and Anatolius, disciples of St. Euthymius the Great (5th century)
- Saint Justa, nun.
- Venerable Nestor.
- Saint Leo of Samos (Leontos), Bishop of Samos, Wonderworker (9th century) (Note: His feast day was originally celebrated on April 29. Today however he is honoured by the local church in Samos on April 26.)

== Pre-Schism Western saints ==
- Peter of Braga (Peter of Rates), first Bishop and martyr of Braga in Portugal (c. 60).
- Saint Marcellinus, a Pope of Rome, who may have been martyred in repentance for his previous errors (304) (Note: "In the same city, in the time of Maximian, St. Marcellinus, pope and martyr, who was beheaded for the faith of Christ, with Claudius, Cyrinus, and Antoninus. So great was the persecution at this time that within a month seventeen thousand Christians were crowned with martyrdom.") (see also: June 7 - East)
- Saint Exuperantia, a saint whose relics are venerated in Troyes in France (c. 380).
- Saint Lucidius of Verona, Bishop of Verona in Italy.
- Saint Clarentius (Clarent), successor of St Etherius as Bishop of Vienne in France (c. 620)
- Saint Trudpert, a hermit, possibly from Ireland, who lived in Münstethal in Germany (c. 644) (Note: He may later have been murdered. The monastery of St Trudpert was built on the site.)
- Saint Richarius (Riquier), Abbot, Confessor, in Picardy (645) (Note: Born at Centula (Celles) near Amiens in the north of France, he became a priest and founded a monastery in his native village, later called Saint-Riquier after him. He was the first to devote himself to the work of ransoming captives and reposed a hermit.)

== Post-Schism Orthodox saints ==
- Venerable George of Cyprus, first Igumen of the Monastery of St. John Chrysostomos, near Koutsovendis, in the Kyrenia District of Cyprus (1091)
- Venerable Calantius of Tamassos (Kalandios), one of the "300 Allemagne Saints" in Cyprus (12th century) (Note: The "300 Allemagne Saints" came to Cyprus from Palestine, and lived as ascetics in various parts of the island. Included among the "300 Allemagne Saints" are: Venerable Anastasios the Wonderwoker of Cyprus, September 17; Venerable Abbacum the Ascetic of Cyprus, Wonderworker, December 2; Venerable Cassian the Martyr (Kassianos), December 4; Martyr Constantine of Cyprus (Constantine of Allemagne), Wonderworker, July 1; According to some of their lives in the Great Synaxaristes, after the dissolution of the Second Crusade (1147 - 1149), they decided to live the monastic life in the Jordan desert. However since the Latins there disturbed them, they relocated to Cyprus and dispersed over the island.)
- Saint Stephen of Perm, Bishop of Perm (1396)
- New Martyrs of Novo Selo ("Holy Trinity" Novoselska convent), Bulgaria (1876)

=== New martyrs and confessors ===
- New martyrs John Pankov, priest, and his children Nicholas Pankov, and Peter Pankov, new martyrs of Orlov (1918)
- Venerable Elder Ieronymos of Simonopetra (1957) (Note: On October 20, 2019, at the Protaton Church in Karyes on Mt. Athos, Ecumenical Patriarch Bartholomew announced the glorification of four great 20th-century Athonite elders would soon proceed, including: Daniel of Katounakia (†1929); Ieronymos of Simonopetra (†1957); Joseph the Hesychast (†1959), and; Ephraim of Katounakia (†1998).; The official statement from the Ecumenical Patriarchate was made on November 27, 2019: (in Greek) "Εἰδικώτερον, ἡ Ἁγία καί Ἱερά Σύνοδος, ἀποδεχθεῖσα εἰσήγησιν τῆς Κανονικῆς Ἐπιτροπῆς ἀνέγραψεν εἰς τό Ἁγιολόγιον τῆς Ὀρθοδόξου Ἐκκλησίας τούς ἐγνωσμένης ὁσιακῆς βιοτῆς καί πολιτείας Ἱερομόναχον Ἱερώνυμον Σιμωνοπετρίτην, Καθηγούμενον χρηματίσαντα τῆς ἐν Ἁγίῳ Ὄρει Ἱερᾶς Βασιλικῆς, Πατριαρχικῆς καί Σταυροπηγιακῆς Μονῆς Σίμωνος Πέτρας, καί ἀκολούθως Οἰκονόμον καί Πνευματικόν τοῦ Μετοχίου Ἀναλήψεως Βύρωνος Ἀττικῆς, καί Ἀρχιμανδρίτην Σωφρόνιον Σαχάρωφ, Καθηγούμενον χρηματίσαντα καί κτίτορα τῆς ἐν Ἔσσεξ Ἀγγλίας Ἱερᾶς Πατριαρχικῆς καί Σταυροπηγιακῆς Μονῆς Τιμίου Προδρόμου.") (Note: On April 20, 1920, the Sunday of the Holy Myrrhbearers, he was enthroned as the Abbot of the Monastery of his repentance (Simonopetra). On June 15, 1931, he was exiled to the Monastery of Koutloumousiou and in three months he was sent to the "Metochion" ("Dependency") of Simonopetra in Athens, named after the Holy Ascension of Christ. In 1937 he was re-elected Abbot of Simonopetra, but he declined this, and he remained at Holy Ascension for twenty more years, until he reposed on January 7th 1957 (the feast of Christmas on the Old Calendar). Therefore, he lived 17 years in his homeland of Asia Minor, 43 years in the Monastery of Simonopetra and 26 years at Holy Ascension in Athens.) (Note: See: (in Greek) Όσιος Ιερώνυμος Σιμωνοπετρίτης ο Μικρασιάτης. Βικιπαίδεια. (Greek Wikipedia).) (see also: May 9 - NS)

== Other commemorations ==
- Translation of the sacred relics of Saint Joanikije of Devič, Serbia (1430) (Note: His feast day is celebrated on December 2.) (Note: See: (in Serbian) Јоаникије Девички. Википедију. (Serbian Wikipedia).)
- Repose of Schema-nun Agnia (Chizhikov) of Akulovo (1984)
- Repose of Schema-Archimandrite Aimilianos (Vafeidis) of Simonopetra (2019)

== Icon gallery ==
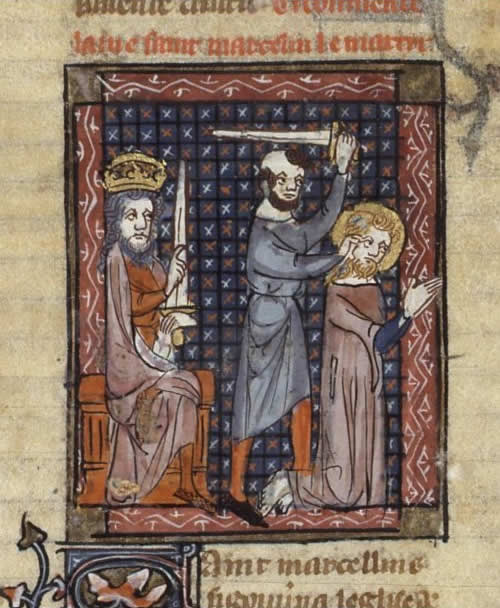
Martyrdom of Pope Marcellinus.

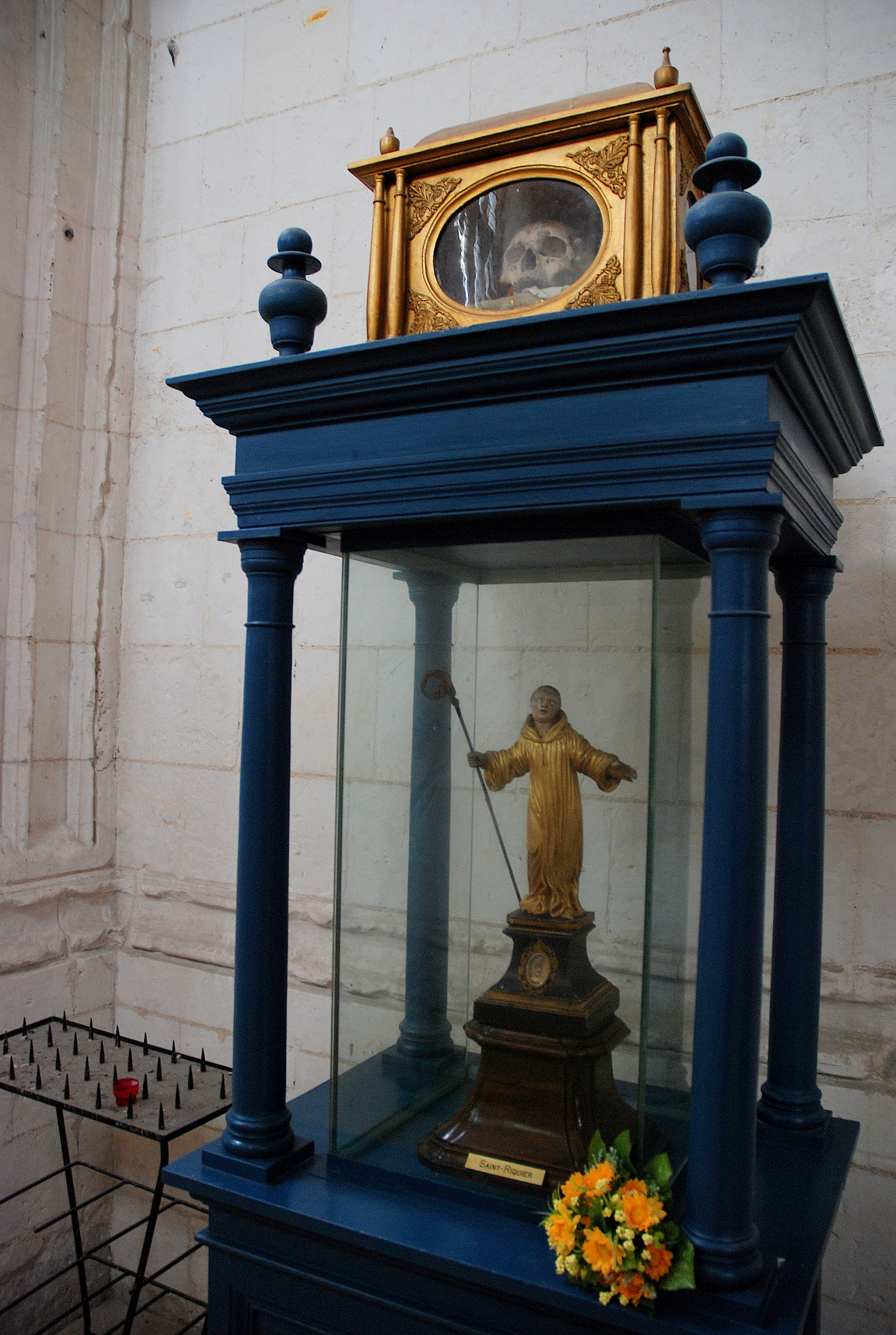
Relics of Saint Richarius, kept in the abbey church of St. Riquier.

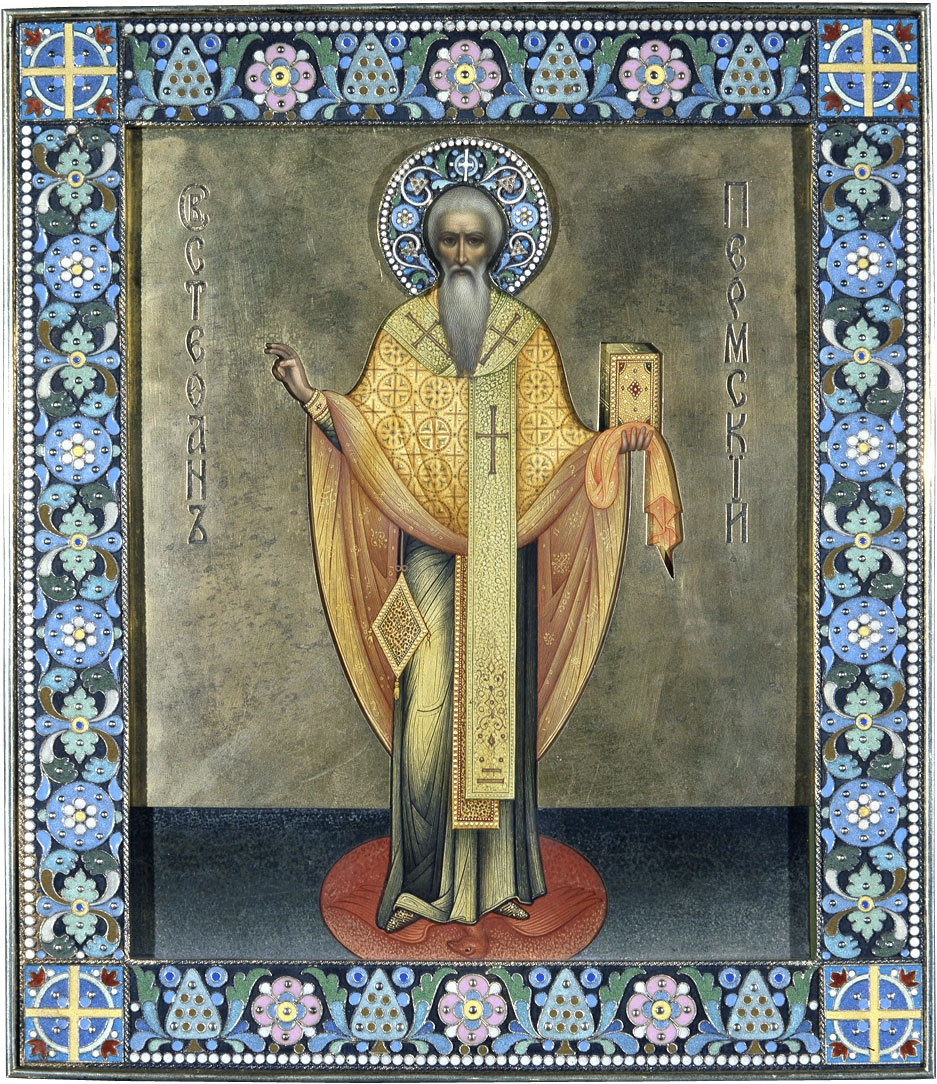
Saint Stephen of Perm.

== Sources ==
- April 26 / May 9. Orthodox Calendar (Pravoslavie.ru).
- May 9 / April 26. Holy Trinity Russian Orthodox Church (A parish of the Patriarchate of Moscow).
- April 26. OCA - The Lives of the Saints.
- The Autonomous Orthodox Metropolia of Western Europe and the Americas (ROCOR). St. Hilarion Calendar of Saints for the year of our Lord 2004. St. Hilarion Press (Austin, TX). p. 31.
- April 26. Latin Saints of the Orthodox Patriarchate of Rome.
- The Roman Martyrology. Transl. by the Archbishop of Baltimore. Last Edition, According to the Copy Printed at Rome in 1914. Revised Edition, with the Imprimatur of His Eminence Cardinal Gibbons. Baltimore: John Murphy Company, 1916. p. 117.
- Rev. Richard Stanton. A Menology of England and Wales, or, Brief Memorials of the Ancient British and English Saints Arranged According to the Calendar, Together with the Martyrs of the 16th and 17th Centuries. London: Burns & Oates, 1892. pp. 182–183.

Greek Sources

- Great Synaxaristes: (in Greek) 26 Απριλίου. Μέγας Συναξαριστής.
- (in Greek) Συναξαριστής. 26 Απριλίου. Ecclesia.gr. (H Εκκλησία της Ελλάδος).

Russian Sources

- (in Russian) 9 мая (26 апреля). Православная Энциклопедия под редакцией Патриарха Московского и всея Руси Кирилла (электронная версия). (Orthodox Encyclopedia - Pravenc.ru).
- (in Russian) 26 апреля (ст.ст.) 9 мая 2013 (нов. ст.). Русская Православная Церковь Отдел внешних церковных связей. (DECR).
