= Ferdinand Monoyer =

French ophthalmologist

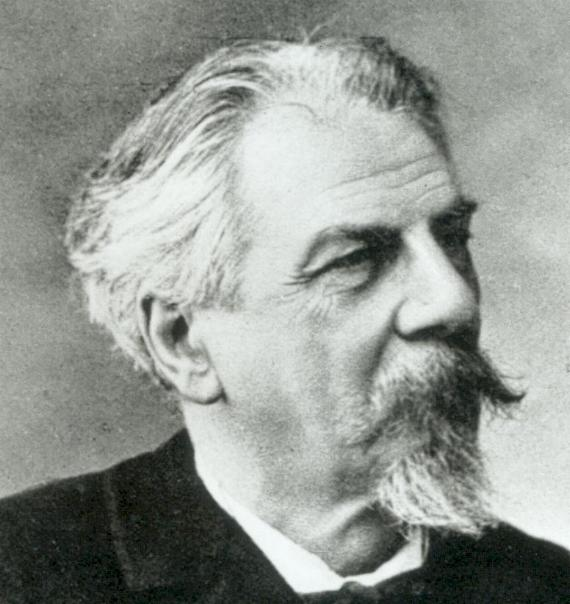
- Born: 9 May 1836; Lyon, France
- Died: 11 July 1912 (aged 76); Lyon, France
- Occupation: ophthalmologist

Ferdinand Monoyer (9 May 1836 – 11 July 1912) was a French ophthalmologist, known for introducing the dioptre in 1872.

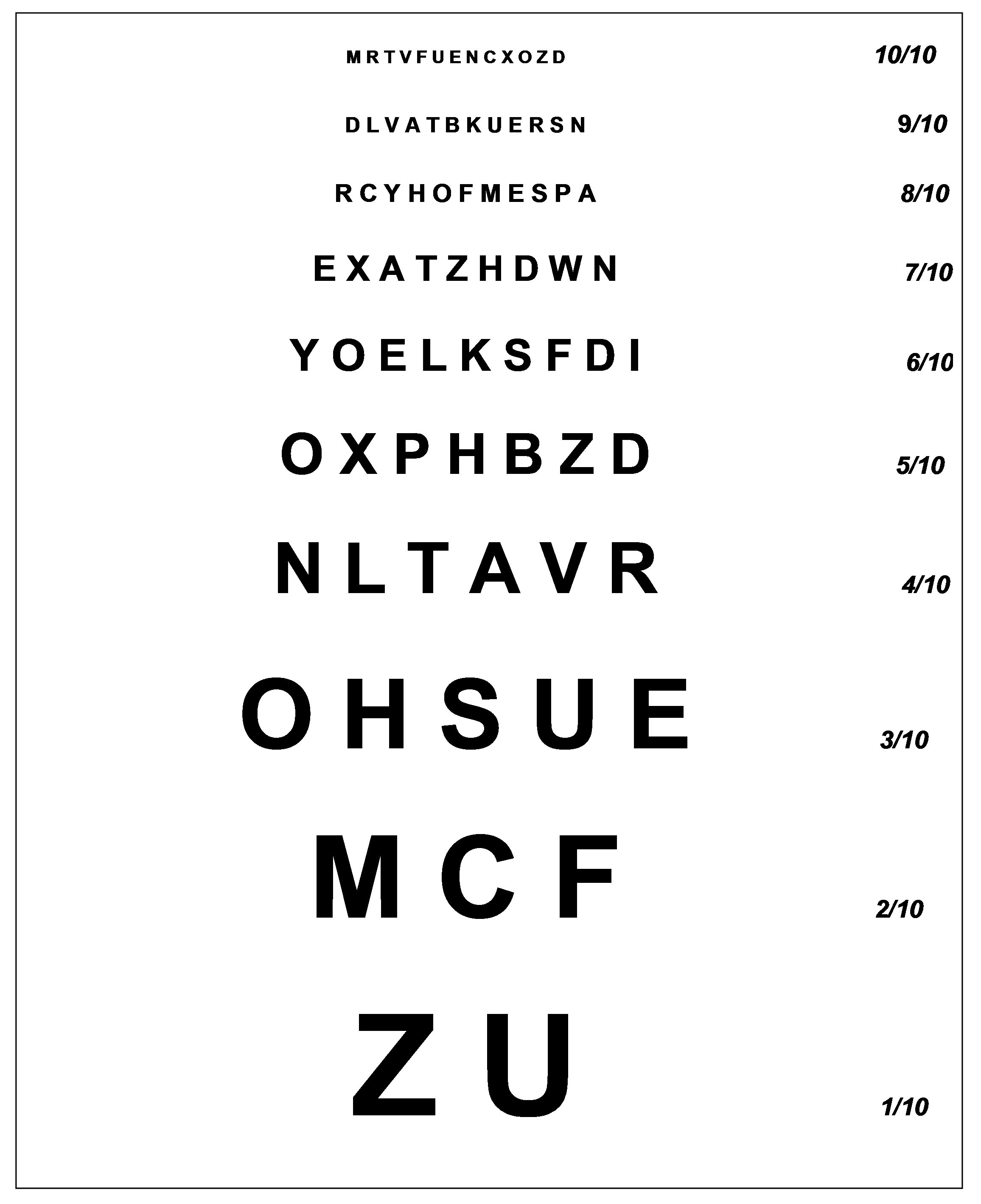
Monoyer chart. Reading upwards on both ends (ignoring the last line), the name "Ferdinand Monoyer" can be seen

He invented the Monoyer chart, used to test visual acuity. He inserted his name in the random letters of the chart. It appears when one reads vertically from bottom to top on each side.

== Biography ==
Monoyer was of Alsatian heritage by his mother and his father was a French military doctor.

He was an associate professor of medical physics at the Faculty of Medicine, University of Strasbourg in 1871. Later, he was the director of the Ophthalmic Clinic of the Faculty of Medicine, Nancy-Université from 1872 to 1877. He was also professor of medical physics at the Faculty of Medicine, University of Lyon, from 1877 to 1909.

== Death ==
Monoyer died at the age of 76 years. His tomb is located in the Cimetière de la Guillotière in Lyon. On Saturday 13 July 1912, a long procession of friends and members of the Faculty of Medicine at the University of Lyon accompanied Professor Monoyer to his final resting place; Professor Hugounenq traced Monoyer's career as chair at the University of Lyon, Associate Professor Nogier spoke on behalf of the students of the late master and Louis Dor made a speech on behalf of the Ophthalmological Society of Lyon.

The speech made in Monoyer's honour by the president of Société nationale de Médecine de Lyon during 11 November 1912 session of the Société was concluded as such: "To the memory of this scholar, the Medical Society bows with respect and sadness; it has lost a friend who was also her counselor who knew to think and to reflect."
