= John of Constantinople =

Confessor of the Faith, Venerable
- Born: Irinoupolis
- Died: 839; Aphousia (now modern-day Avşa, Turkey)
- Honored in: Eastern Orthodox Church; Roman Catholic Church
- Feast: 27 April (Eastern Orthodox); 19 April (Roman Catholic)

John of Constantinople (died 839), also known as John the Confessor, was an abbot of the Cathares Monastery, in Constantinople. He clashed with the Byzantine Emperor Leo the Armenian, who was instituting a policy of iconoclasm. John survived torture for his iconodulism. He is considered a saint by the Eastern Orthodox Church and the Roman Catholic Church, and is celebrated by them on 27 April and 18 April respectively.
