= Andreas Anagnostakis =

Greek ophthalmologist (1826–1897)

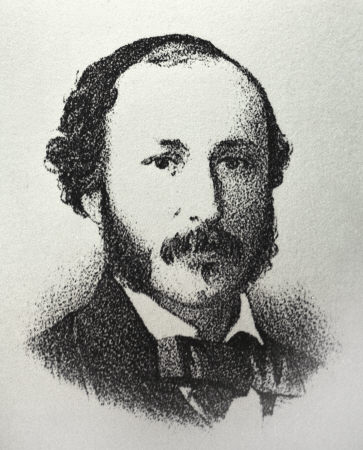
- Born: 11 August 1826; Antikythera, United States of the Ionian Islands (now Greece)
- Died: 27 March 1897 (aged 70); Athens, Greece
- Education: University of Athens
- Occupations: Ophthalmologist, writer, physician
- Known for: Ophthalmoscope
- Medical career
- Profession: Physician; Ophthalmologist; Educator
- Field: Ophthalmology

Andreas Anagnostakis (Ανδρέας Αναγνωστάκης; 11 August 1826 – 27 March 1897) was a Greek ophthalmologist, physician, and educator. He is best known for inventing the ophthalmoscope, a handheld tool used in diagnostics and still relevant today. He is credited as the first ophthalmologist in Greece.

== Biography ==
=== Early life ===
Anagnostakis was born 11 August 1826 on the Greek island of Antikythera. His parents were from the village of Anopolis in Sfakia, Crete and possibly from one of the original founding Sfakiote families. They fled Cretan Turks on the island and settled in Syra, where Andreas attended school. He later went to the Medical School at the University of Athens, then continued his studies, funded by Queen Amalia, in Vienna, Berlin, and Paris. He graduated from Athens in 1849 with his doctorate in medicine. He was initially a general physician before deciding to specialize in ophthalmology.

=== Career ===
While studying in France, he came up with the idea to add a concave mirror to ophthalmoscopes previously suggested by Hermann von Helmholtz, Theodor Ruete, Eugène Follin, Cocius, William Cumming, Charles Babbage, and Eduard Jäger. The idea for his improvements to the ophthalmoloscope were inspired by ancient Greek writings, for example "the basic law governing the reflection of light when the reflected ray lies in the plane of incidents of the incident ray, the knowledge of the focus and the straight lines under which the objects reflected in flat and spherical mirrors are seen." He further developed the idea of a handheld tool in London; Richard Liebreich developed the model. Anagnostakis decreased the size of Ruete's ophthalmoscope and added a 5 cm concave mirror "with a focal distance of 4.5 inches" and a 4mm hole in the center. He recommended the addition of a convex lens, as Louis-Auguste Desmarres used, to flip the image from the mirror.

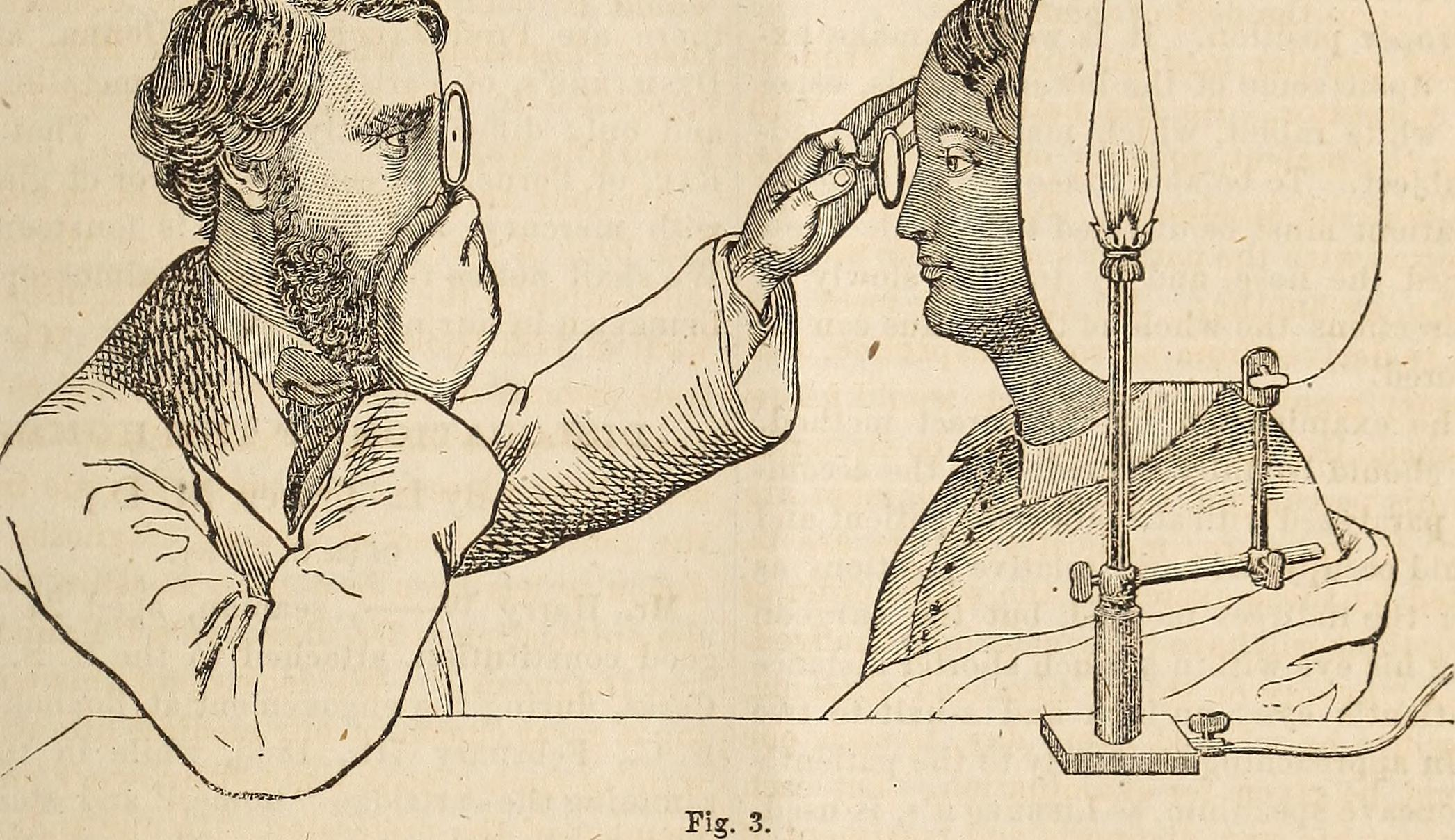
Anagnostakis ophthalmoscope, designed by Richard Liebreich

Anagnostakis used the ophthalmoscope in his clinical work before presenting it at the first-ever Ophthalmological Conference in Brussels in 1857. In 1915, after Anagnostakis' death, William Noah Allyn and Frederick Welch (of Welch Allyn) built upon his work by adding direct illumination to the handheld device; their version was a step closer to what we use today.

After the initial development of the ophthalmoscope, he returned to Greece and became the director of Ophthalmiatreion, a new eye hospital; he held this position for 41 years until his death. He also became an associate professor of ophthalmology and otology at the University of Athens in 1854 before becoming a full professor in 1856. He is considered the first ophthalmology professor in Greece. Alexios Trantas studied under him during his time at the university. Anagnostakis served as the president of the University of Athens in 1877 and was twice the dean of the Medical School, once in 1868 and again in 1873.

Anagnostakis collaborated with physicians all over the world. In 1853, he worked with his former professor Desmarres.) In 1867, he returned to Berlin to learn about cataract surgery techniques from Albrecht von Graefe, his collaborator and former professor. He also helped Helmholtz with the first version of the ophthalmoloscope. He pioneered treatments and surgical methods for entropion; this method is referred to as the Hotz-Anagnostaki Operation. Ferdinand Carl Hotz describes it as: "A transverse incision from canthus to canthus is made through the skin and subjacent tissues, but instead of being made near and parallel with the free border (as in former methods), the incision in this operation is to follow the upper border of the tarsus."

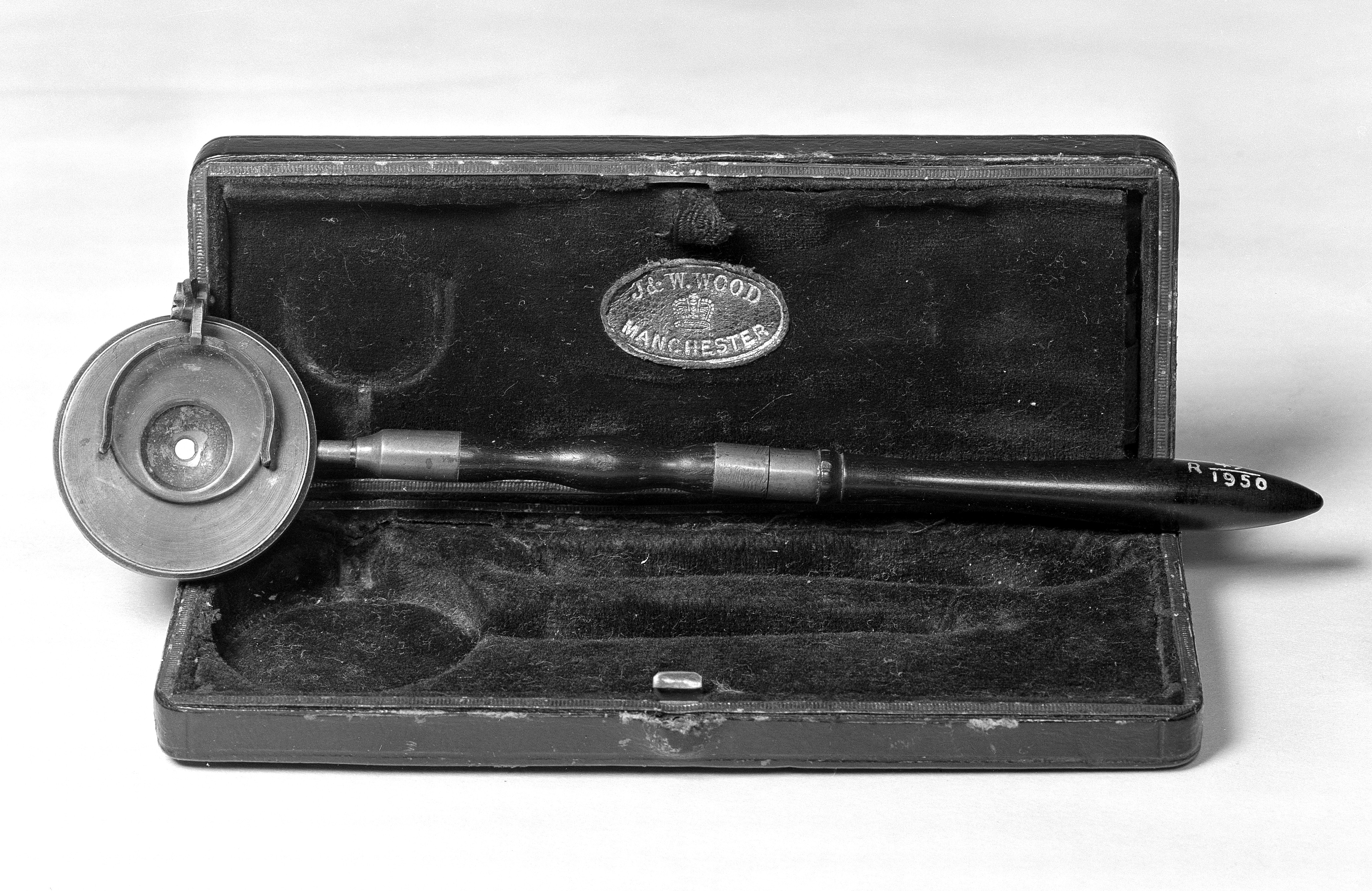
Anagnostakis ophthalmoscope, designed by Richard Liebreich

Outside of his clinical work, Anagnostakis greatly enjoyed ancient Greek literature and poetry. In 1889, he was asked to judge a theatre competition; in 1896, he translated Maria Stuart by playwright Friedrich Schiller. He served as president of the first and second Panhellenic Medical Congress (1882 and 1885, respectively); was director for a medical journal; served as editor for the magazine Asklipios; and collaborated on the medical journal Annales D'oculitistique. He wrote extensively as well, including a 7-volume book called The History of Ophthalmology. In The Medicine of Aristophanes (1891), he explored the medical subjects mentioned in Aristophanes' plays, and looked at how Hippocrates, Galen, and Paul of Aegina talked about asepsis and antisepsis in his 1889 book The Antiseptic Methods of the Ancients. Other books and studies include Ophthalmoscope Anagnostaki (1854), Examination of Retina Exploration and Oil Flow by Means of a New Ophthalmoscope (1854), Ophthalmology in Greece and Egypt (1856), On Entrophy and Hair Surgery (1857), The Inventor of Magnifiers (1873), and About the Greek Origin of Convex Lenses. Anagnostakis died in Athens on 27 March 1897.

In 1994, the Hellenic Glaucoma Society began annually awarding the Medal of Honor and Value A. Anagnostaki — A. Tranta, named after him and his student Alexios Trantas, to ophthalmologists contributing to glaucoma research. There is also a commemorative bust of him in Markopoulou Square near Chania that incorrectly lists his lifespan as 1896—1897, rather than 1826—1897.
