= Charles Deval =

French ophthalmologist (1806–1862)

Charles Deval (December 6, 1806 – April 9, 1862) was a French ophthalmologist born in Pera, Constantinople, He was the son of dragoman Constantin Deval (1767–1816).

He studied medicine in Paris, receiving his doctorate in 1834. For a few years he studied with Frédéric Jules Sichel, and in 1839, he started his own practice.

Deval is largely remembered for his written works on ophthalmic medicine, in particular, the 1844 "Traité de Chirurgie Oculaire", which was only the second French work devoted exclusively to eye surgery. This book was important because it helped introduce German and Austrian ophthalmic practices into French medicine. Prior to this publication, descriptions regarding methods of ophthalmological surgery practiced in these countries were not yet available in the French language. This book was a result of Deval's studies in Vienna with Friedrich Jäger von Jaxtthal (1784–1871) and Anton von Rosas (1791–1855). Included in his treatise were explanations of medical innovations developed by German surgeons Louis Stromeyer (1804–1876) and Johann Friedrich Dieffenbach (1792–1847).

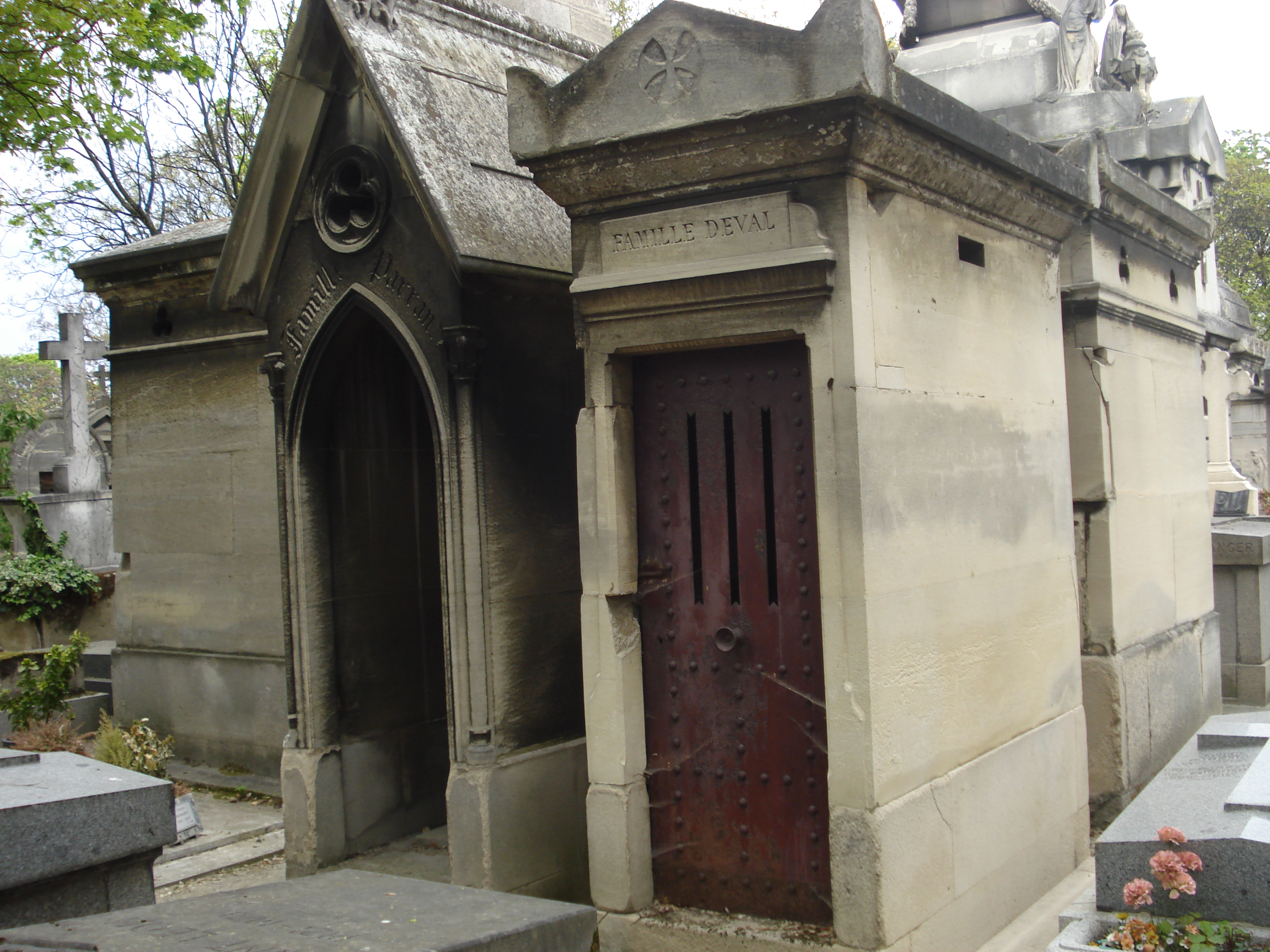
Sepulture of Charles Deval at Montmartre Cemetery in Paris.

Another important written work by Deval was the 1862 "Traité théorique et pratique des maladies des yeux", which was a treatise on diseases of the eye, and a culmination of his experiences working with over 20,000 cases in ophthalmic medicine. (Note: Deval's treatise is not to be confused with Louis-Auguste Desmarres' 1847 "Traité théorique et pratique des maladies des yeux").

== Selected writings ==
- Deux années à Constantinople et en Morée (1825-1826) (1828) – Two years in Constantinople and Morea, 1825-26.
- Traité de Chirurgie Oculaire (1844) – Treatise on ocular surgery.
- Traité de l'amaurose ou de la goutte-sereine (1851) – Treatise on amaurosis.
- Traité théorique et pratique des maladies des yeux (1862) – Theoretical and practical treatise on maladies of the eye.
