= Rudolf Wagner =

German scientist

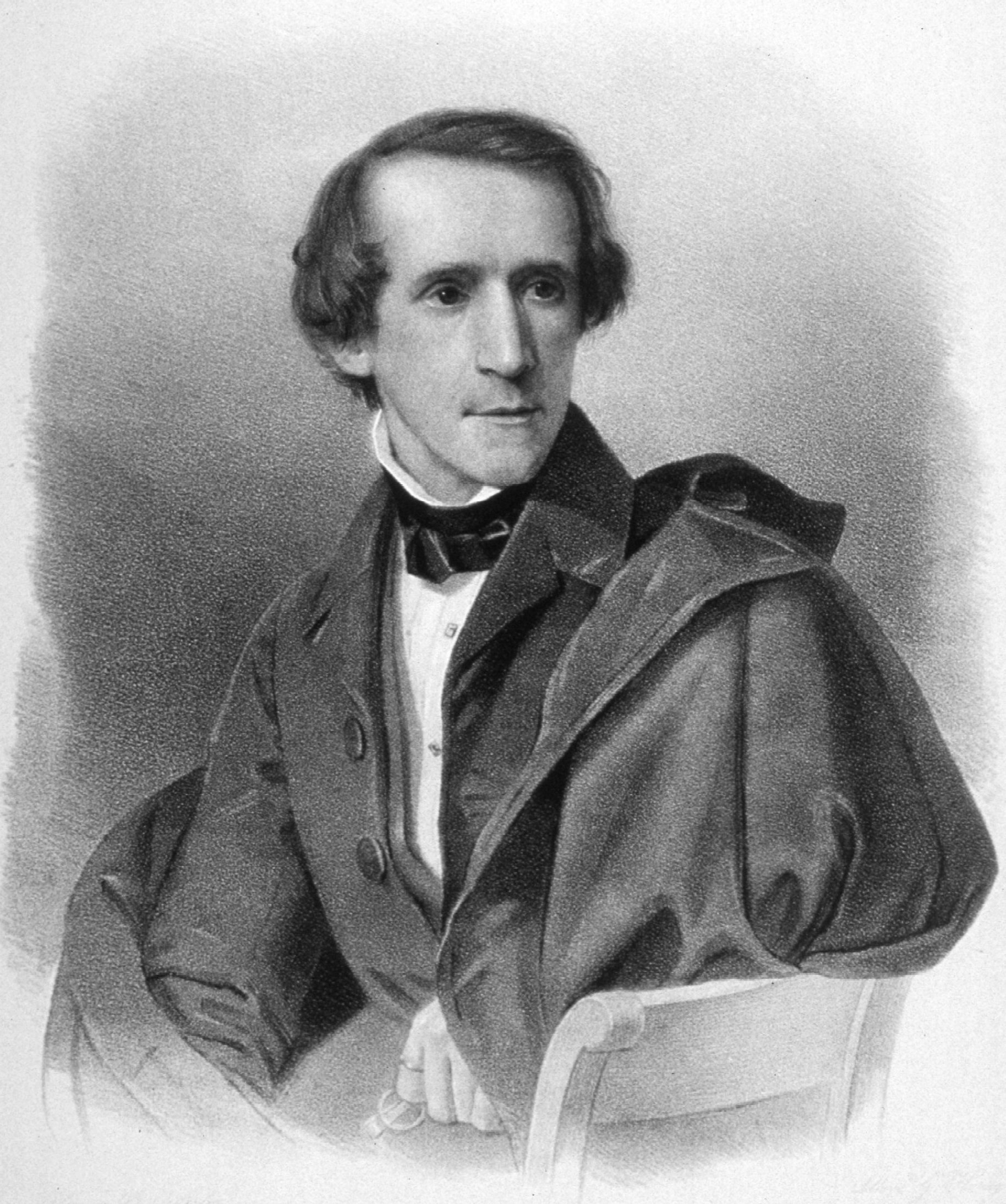
- Born: 30 June 1805; Bayreuth, Kingdom of Prussia
- Died: 13 May 1864 (aged 58); Göttingen, Kingdom of Hanover
- Education: University of Erlangen; University of Würzburg (MD)
- Scientific career
- Fields: Anatomy, physiology
- Workplaces: University of Erlangen, University of Göttingen
- Doctoral advisor: Johann Lukas Schönlein
- Other academic advisors: Georges Cuvier, Karl Friedrich Heusinger
- Doctoral students: Rudolf Leuckart

Rudolf Friedrich Johann Heinrich Wagner (30 July 1805 – 13 May 1864) was a German anatomist and physiologist and the co-discoverer of the germinal vesicle. He made important investigations on ganglia, nerve-endings, and the sympathetic nerves.

== Life ==
Rudolf Wagner was born at Bayreuth, where his father was a professor in the gymnasium. He began the study of medicine at Erlangen in 1822. Wagner completed his curriculum in 1826 at Würzburg, where he mainly studied under Johann Lukas Schönlein in medicine and under Karl Friedrich Heusinger in comparative anatomy. Aided by a public stipend, he spent a year or more studying in the Jardin des Plantes, under the friendly eye of Georges Cuvier, and making zoological discoveries at Cagliari and other places on the Mediterranean.

On his return to Germany, he set up a medical practice at Augsburg, where his father had been transferred. A few months later he found an opening for an academic position when he was appointed prosector at Erlangen. In 1832 he became full professor of zoology and comparative anatomy there, and held that office until 1840, when he was called to succeed J. F. Blumenbach at Göttingen. He remained at the Hanoverian university until his death, being much occupied with administrative work as pro-rector for a number of years, and for nearly the whole of his residence troubled by ill health from tuberculosis.

In 1860 he gave over the physiological part of his teaching to a new chair, retaining the zoological, with which his career had begun. While at Frankfurt, on his way to examine the Neanderthal skull at Bonn, he was struck with paralysis. Wagner died at Göttingen a few months later on 13 May 1864.

== Contributions ==
Wagner's activity as a writer and worker was enormous, and his range extensive, most of his hard work having been done at Erlangen while his health was good. His graduation thesis was on the progress of the working classes. The ambitious title of The historical development of epidemic and contagious diseases all over the world, with the laws of their diffusion showed the influence of Schönlein.

His first treatise was Die Naturgeschichte des Menschen (in 2 vols., Kempten, 1831). Frequent journeys to the Mediterranean, the Adriatic, and the North Sea gave him abundant materials for research on invertebrate anatomy and physiology, which he communicated first to the Munich Academy of Sciences, and republished in his Beiträge zur vergleichenden Physiologie des Blutes (Leipzig, 1832–33, with additions in 1838). In 1834–35, he brought out a textbook on the subject he chaired (Lehrbuch der vergleichenden Anatomie, Leipzig), which recommended itself to students by its clear and concise style. A new edition of it appeared in 1843 under the title of Lehrbuch der Zootomie, of which only the vertebrate section was corrected by himself.

The precision of his earlier work is evidenced by his Micrometric Measurements of the Elementary Parts of Man and Animals (Leipzig, 1834). His zoological labours may be said to conclude with the atlas Icones zootomicae (Leipzig, 1841). In 1835, he communicated to the Munich Academy of Sciences his researches on the physiology of generation and development, including the famous discovery of the germinal vesicle of the human ovum.

These were republished under the title Prodromus historiae generationis hominis atque animalium (Leipzig, 1836). As in zoology, his original researches in physiology were followed by a students' textbook, Lehrbuch der speciellen Physiologie (Leipzig, 1838), which soon reached a third edition and was translated into French and English. This was supplemented by an atlas, Icones physiologicae (Leipzig, 1839).

To the same period belongs a very interesting (but now little-known) work on medicine proper, of a historical and synthetic scope: Grundriss der Encyklopädie und Methodologie der medicinischen Wissenschaften nach geschichtlicher Ansicht (Erlangen, 1838). It was translated into Danish. About the same time he worked on a translation of James Cowles Prichard's Natural History of Man, and edited various writings of Samuel Thomas Sommerring, with a biography of that anatomist (1844), which he himself fancied most of all his writings.

In 1843, after his removal to Göttingen, he began his great Handwörterbuch der Physiologie mit Rücksicht auf physiologische Pathologie (1, 2, 3.1, 3.2, 4), and brought out the fifth (supplementary) volume in 1852. His only original contributions to this work were on the sympathetic nerve, nerve-ganglia and nerve-endings, and he modestly disclaimed all merit except as being the organizer. While resident in Italy for his health from 1845 to 1847, he occupied himself with research on the electrical organ of the torpedo genus of electric eels and on nervous organization generally; these he published in 1853–1854 (Neurologische Untersuchungen, Göttingen), and therewith his physiological period may be said to end.

== Philosophy ==
He boldly stood against materialism and avowed himself a Christian believer. This lost him the respect of a number of his old friends and pupils, and was unfeelingly told that he was "suffering from an atrophy of the brain." His quarrel with Carl Vogt and other materialists began with his oration at the Göttingen meeting of the Naturforscher-Versammlung in 1854, on "Menschenschöpfung und Seelensubstanz." This was followed by a series of "Physiological Letters" in the Allgemeine Zeitung, by an essay on "Glauben and Wissen," and by the most important piece of this series, "Der Kampf um die Seele vom Standpunkt der Wissenschaft" (Göttingen, 1857).

Having come to the consideration of these philosophical problems late in life, he was at some disadvantage; but he endeavoured to join as he best could in the current of contemporary German thought. He had an exact knowledge of classical German writings, especially of Goethe's, and of the literature connected with him.

== Paleoanthropology ==
In what may be called his fourth and last period, Wagner became an anthropologist and archaeologist. He occupied himself with the cabinet of skulls in the Göttingen museum collected by Blumenbach and with the excavation of prehistoric remains, corresponded actively with the anthropological societies of Paris and London, and organized, in co-operation with the veteran Karl Ernst von Baer, a successful congress of anthropologists at Göttinger in 1861. His last writings were memoirs on the convolutions of the human brain, on the weight of brains, and on the brains of idiots (1860–1862).
