= Cajetan von Textor =

German surgeon (1782–1860)

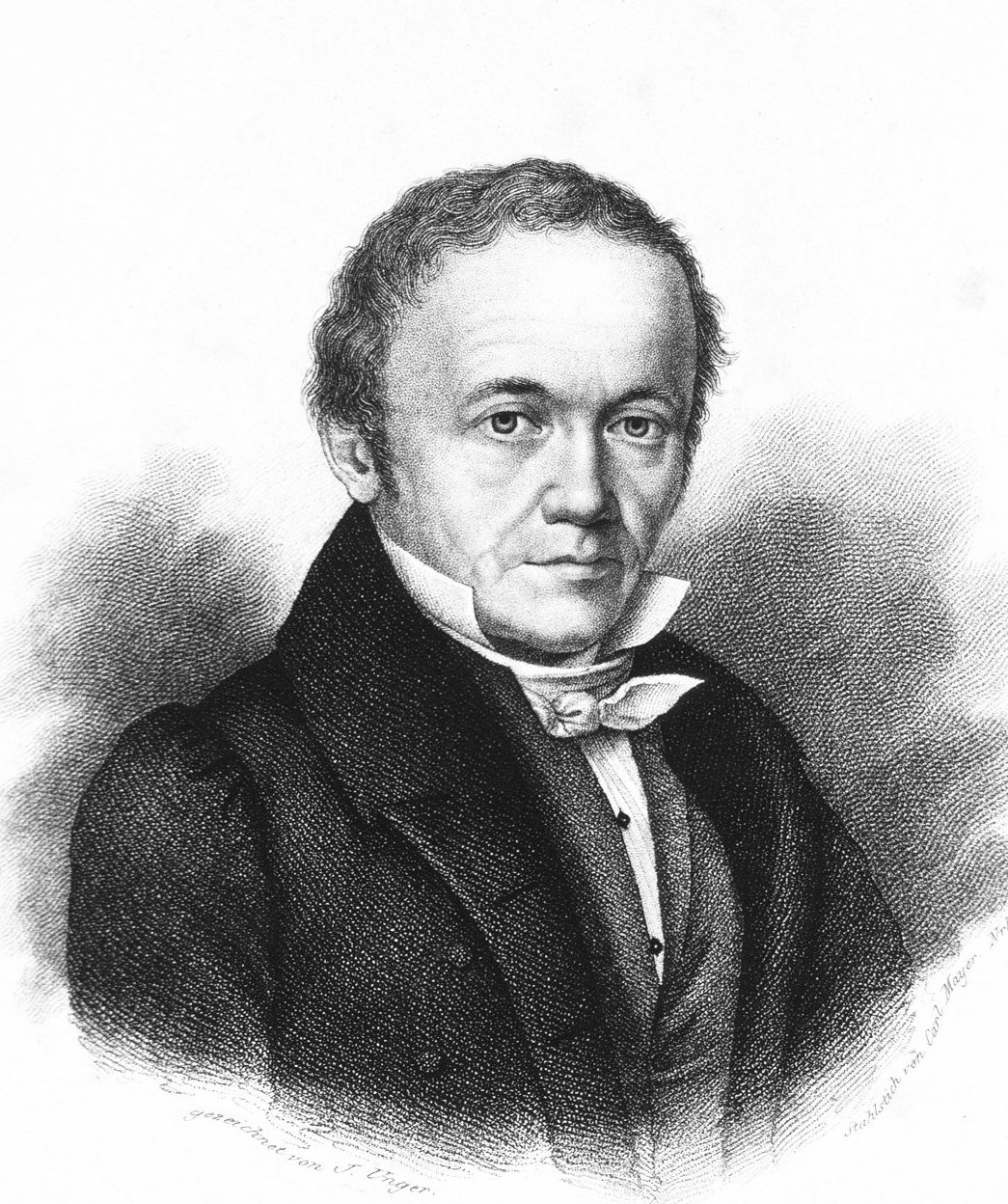

Cajetan von Textor (28 December 1782 – 7 August 1860) was a German surgeon born in the Ebersberg district of Upper Bavaria.

From 1804 to 1808 he studied at the University of Landshut, where he was a pupil of Philipp Franz von Walther (1782–1849). He spent the next few years on an extended educational journey throughout Europe, where he studied with Alexis Boyer (1757–1833) in Paris, Antonio Scarpa (1752–1832) in Pavia and Georg Joseph Beer (1763–1821) in Vienna. Afterwards he was second physician at the general hospital in Munich.

In 1816 he was appointed professor of surgery and Oberwundarzt in the Juliusspital at the University of Würzburg. In 1832 he was relieved of his duties at Würzburg and banished to the surgical school at Landshut because of suspicion of political ties to the July Revolution and the Hambach Festival. In 1834 he was reinstated at Würzburg, where he remained for the rest of his career. One of his better known students was Bernhard Heine (1800–1846), inventor of the osteotome.

In the field of surgery, Cajetan von Textor was a specialist of bone and joint operations. Among his publications was a German translation of Alexis Boyer's surgical work titled Grundzüge zur Lehre der chirurgischen Operationen (1818–1827, 2nd edition 1834–1841).
