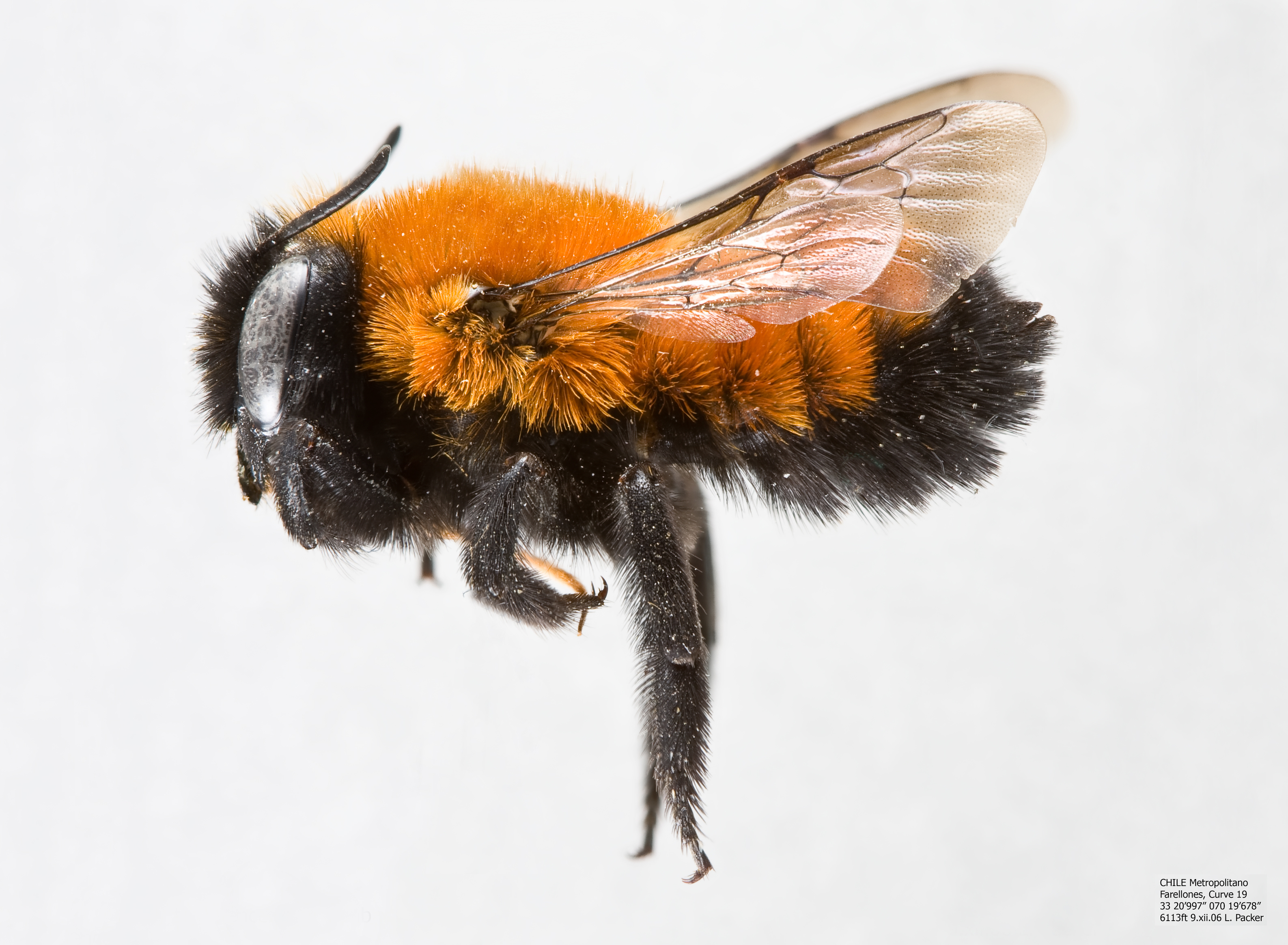
- Female

Scientific classification
- Domain: Eukaryota
- Kingdom: Animalia
- Phylum: Arthropoda
- Class: Insecta
- Order: Hymenoptera
- Family: Megachilidae
- Genus: Megachile
- Species: M. semirufa

Binomial name
- Megachile semirufa Sichel, 1867

= Megachile semirufa =

Species of leafcutter bee (Megachile)

Megachile semirufa is a species of bee in the family Megachilidae. It was described by Frédéric Jules Sichel in 1867.
