= École des Jeunes de langues =

French language school

The École des Jeunes de langues was a language school founded by Jean-Baptiste Colbert in 1669 to train interpreters and translators (then called dragomans after the Ottoman and Arabic word for such a figure, like Covielle in Le Bourgeois gentilhomme) in the languages of the Levant (Turkish, Arabic, Persian, Armenian, etc.) for ancien regime France. It systematized such training activity, which had begun informally at the Collège des trois langues; the latter had been created in 1530 by Francis I of France on the initiative of Henry IV's widow, Marie de Medici, to offer a course in Arabic.

The training of the students (jeunes de langues) was done partly in Constantinople and partly in Paris. They were often the sons of French diplomats or merchants already operating in the Ottoman Empire or the Christian areas of the east.

It was annexed in the 18th century by the Collège des Jésuites, the future lycée Louis le Grand. In the 19th century, the school was gradually absorbed into the École des langues orientales.

== Alumni ==
- Jean-Baptiste Adanson, (1732–1804)
- Alexandre Deval, (1716–1771)
- Charles Deval, (1806–1862)
- Constantin Deval, (1767–1816)
- Charles Fonton, (1725–1793)
- Lary Baldwin, (1736–1801)
