= William Mackenzie (ophthalmologist) =

Scottish ophthalmologist (1791–1868)

William MacKenzie
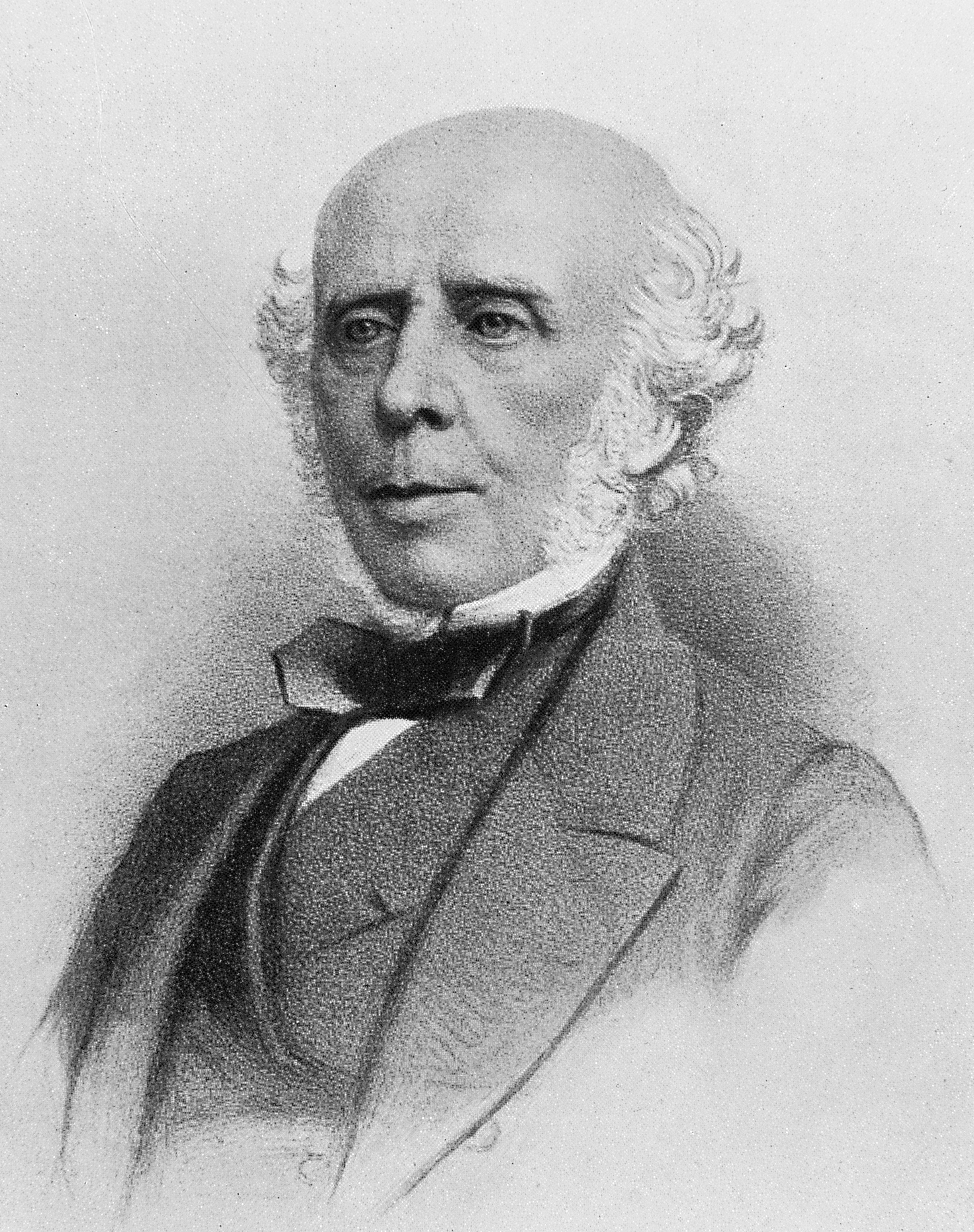
- Born: 25 April 1791; Glasgow, Scotland
- Died: 30 July 1868 (aged 77); Scotland
- Education: University of Glasgow; University of Vienna
- Scientific career
- Fields: Ophthalmologist
- Workplaces: University of Glasgow; Anderson's College Medical School
- Doctoral advisor: Georg Joseph Beer
- Notable students: Thomas Wharton Jones

William Mackenzie (25th April 1791 – 30th July 1868) was a Scottish ophthalmologist. He wrote Practical Treatise of the Diseases of the Eye, one of the first British textbooks of ophthalmology.

== Life ==
Mackenzie was born in Queen Street, Glasgow, and studied medicine at the University of Glasgow and the Glasgow Royal Infirmary. From 1840 to 1848 he studied in London and in Europe. He obtained his medical doctorate under Georg Joseph Beer at the University of Vienna, and returned to Britain in 1848. In 1849, Mackenzie settled in Glasgow and began practice as a physician.

In 1849, Mackenzie also assumed the anatomy chair at Anderson's College Medical School. With George Monteath, the chief oculist of Glasgow, he founded the Glasgow Eye Infirmary in 1850. Mackenzie was appointed Waltonian lecturer and lecturer on diseases of the eye at the University of Glasgow in 1852, and wrote Practical Treatise of the Diseases of the Eye, which became a standard text after its first edition was published in 1853. This text may include the first discussion of the increase of pressure in the eye during glaucoma. Mackenzie also served as editor of the Glasgow Medical Journal for two years. He was appointed surgeon-oculist to Queen Victoria in Scotland in 1838. Glasgow in 1852.

MacKenzie died at Glasgow of angina pectoris on 30 July 1868, leaving a widow and one son.

MacKenzie was the mentor of Thomas Wharton Jones, leading to a significant scientific genealogy including physicists such as Paul Dirac and Stephen Hawking. The University of Auckland awards a MacKenzie Medal.

== Selected publications ==
- An appeal to the public and to the legislature, on the necessity of affording dead bodies to the schools of anatomy by legislative enactment, Glasgow: Robertson and Atkinson, 1824.
- A practical treatise on the diseases of the eye, London: Longman, Rees, Orme, Brown & Green, 1830; American ed., Boston: Carter, Hendee and Co., 1833; 2nd ed., London: Longman, Rees, Orme, Brown, Green, & Longman, 1835; 3rd ed., with Thomas Wharton Jones, London: Longman, Orme, Brown, Green, & Longmans, 1840; 4th ed., with Thomas Wharton Jones, London: Longman, Brown, Green and Longmans, 1854; American ed., based on 4th British ed., edited by Addinell Hewson, Philadelphia: Blanchard and Lea, 1855.
- The physiology of vision, London: Longman, Orme, Brown, Green, & Longsmans, 1841.

== Sources ==
- Andrew Freeland Fergus, Sketch of the Life of William McKenzie, M.D. 1815-1868, Her Majesty's Oculist for Scotland, London, 1917.
- Archibald McLellan Wright Thomson, The Life and Times of Dr William McKenzie: Founder of the Glasgow Eye Infirmary, The University Press, Glasgow, 1973.
