= Joseph Barth =

Austrian ophthalmologist (1746–1818)

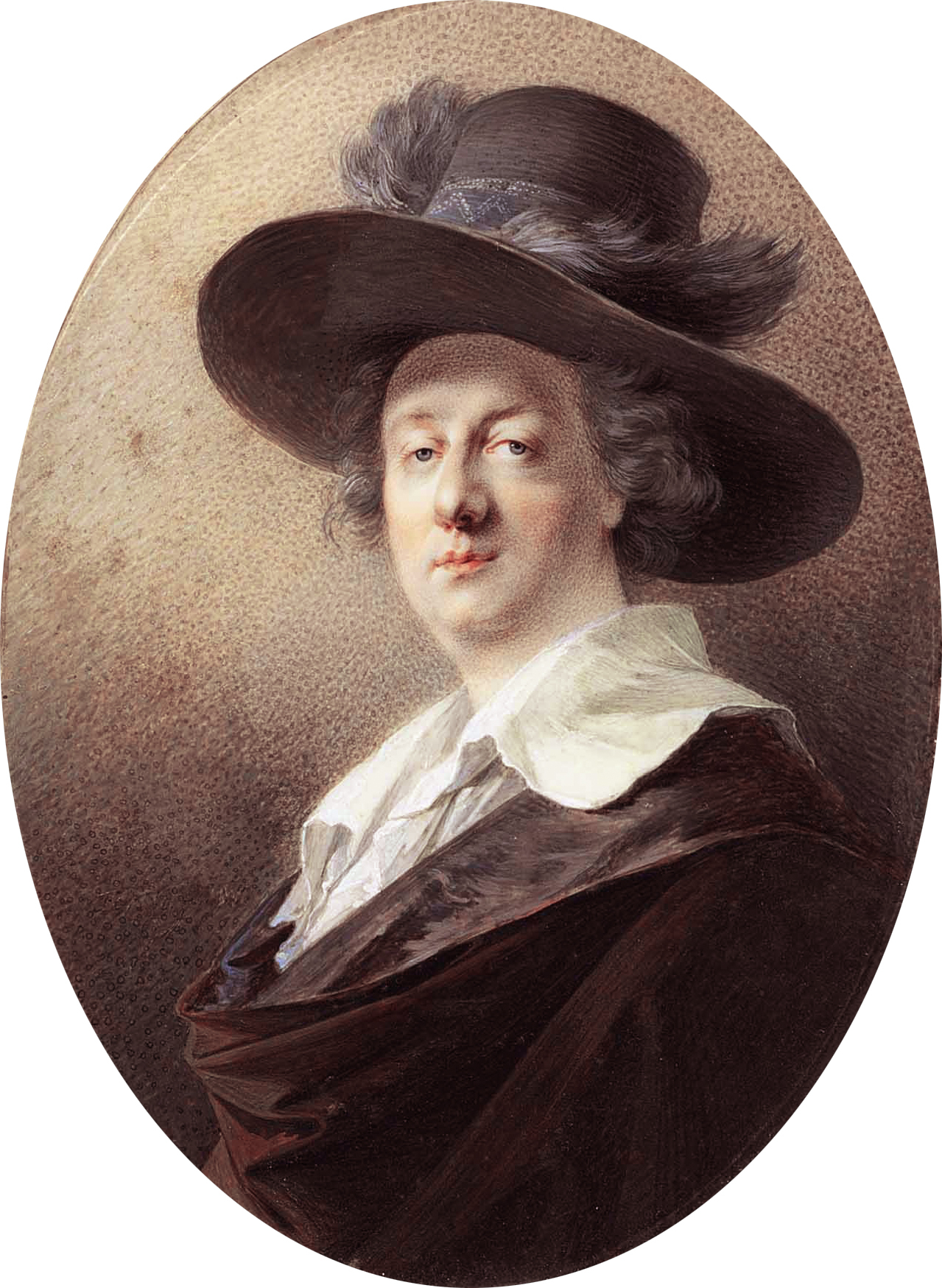
- Joseph Barth (1746-1818) (Heinrich Friedrich Füger)
- Born: 28 October 1746; Valletta, Hospitaller Malta
- Died: 7 April 1818 (aged 71); Vienna, Austrian Empire
- Education: University of Vienna (M.D., 1772)
- Scientific career
- Fields: Ophthalmology
- Workplaces: University of Vienna
- Doctoral advisor: Anton von Störck
- Doctoral students: Georg Joseph Beer; Johann Adam Schmidt; Georg Prochaska

Joseph Barth (28 October 1746 – 7 April 1818) was a Maltese-born Austrian ophthalmologist. He is believed to have been the first professor of ophthalmology.

== Education ==
He studied at the Anatomical and Surgical School at Sacra Infermeria in Valletta (Malta), the Santo Spirito Hospital in Rome (Italy), the University of Vienna (Austria). He earned his medical doctorate from Vienna in 1772.

== Career ==
He was appointed Public Teacher in Ophthalmology and Anatomy (1773), Professor of Ophthalmology and Anatomy (1774) and Oculist and Professor of Physiology (1786) at the University of Vienna; he was nominated Royal Counsellor (1774) and appointed oculist to Emperor Joseph II (1776); he retired in 1791 but maintained the post of personal imperial physician and ophthalmologist until his death.

== Achievements ==
Joseph Barth was to gain renown in ophthalmologic practice and to occupy the first Chair of Ophthalmology in Europe, at the Medical University of Vienna. His appointment to the post by the Empress Maria Theresa of Austria was made in consideration of his "special skill in eye diseases as well as his aptitude in finer anatomy". The professorship occupied by Barth remained the leader in ophthalmology with the subsequent professorship being instituted in Berlin only in 1866.

In Malta the professorship in ophthalmology was only established in 1880 being incumbent by Professor Lawrence Manche. Barth also opened a private nursing home and the first public eye clinic in the Vienna General Hospital in 1784, wherein he operated on cases of cataract. He apparently designed the original version of the "Beer's knife" that was subsequently modified and popularised by his student. His clinical renown led to his appointment as Imperial Oculist after he successfully treated Kaiser Joseph II of a stubborn "ophthalmitis".

Barth was very much a clinical teacher and was responsible for the training of several renowned physicians, notably Joseph Ehrenritter, Johann Adam Schmidt, Georg Joseph Beer, Georg Prochaska, Jacob Santerelli, G.B. Quadri, and Pietro Magistretti. Prochaska and Beer succeeded him in the position of Chair of Ophthalmology. He also established an Anatomical Museum that housed an assembly of 1576 specimens, some prepared by Barth himself. He also founded a medical library that contained 1500 volumes. Barth did not publish extensively preferring clinical teaching.

His publications included an anatomical work on myology Anfangsgrunde der Muskellehre (Vienna, 1786, 2nd ed. 1819) and an operative text on cataract removal Etwas uber die Ausziehung des graven Staars fur den genubten Operateur (Vienna, 1797, Salzburg, 1797). In 1827, Dr Stefano Zerafa described Joseph Barth as "a man of great merits, Maltese citizen, Chief Physician and Counsellor to Her Sacred Majesty, Professor of Sublime Anatomy and Physiology in the Academy of Vienna, undoubtedly the first among ophthalmologists."
