= Johann Adam Schmidt =

German-Austrian surgeon and ophthalmologist

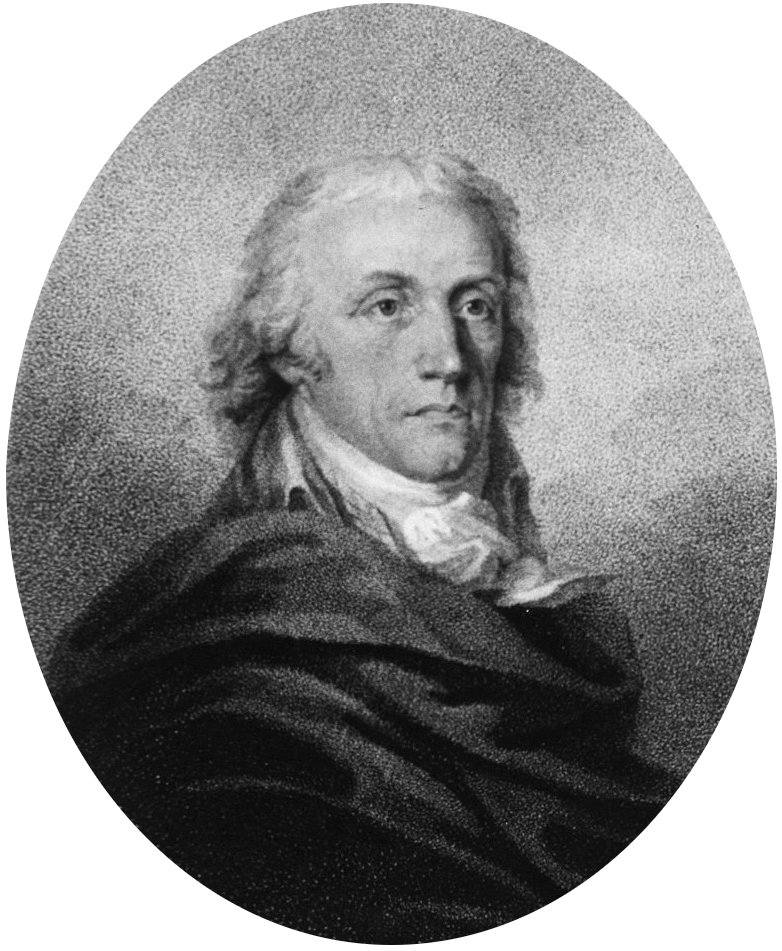
- Schmidt in 1801
- Born: 12 October 1759; Aub
- Died: 19 February 1809 (aged 49)
- Occupations: surgeon ophthalmologist
- Known for: iritis

Johann Adam Schmidt (12 October 1759 – 19 February 1809) was a German-Austrian surgeon and ophthalmologist who was a native of Aub, a town near Würzburg.

He began his medical career as an army Unterchirurg (under surgeon), and later studied ophthalmology under Joseph Barth (1745–1818) in Vienna. In 1795 he became a professor at Josephs-Akademie in Vienna, where he gave lectures on several subjects in medicine.

He performed pioneer research of iritis, and in 1801 was the author of a significant work on the disorder titled Über Nachstaar und Iritis nach Staaroperationen (On Post-Cataract and Inflammation of the Iris following Cataract Surgery). In 1802, together with Karl Gustav Himly (1772–1837) he founded Ophthalmologische Bibliothek, which was the first German magazine of ophthalmic medicine. In 1811, his book Lehrbuch der Materia Medica was published posthumously, which was a work on medicinal plants and their properties. In this book the term "pharmacognosy" is originally coined.

Schmidt is best remembered as a personal physician of Ludwig van Beethoven, whom he attended to from 1801 until 1809. Beethoven dedicated the Trio for piano, violin, and cello in E-flat major Op. 38 (arrangement of the Septet Op. 20) to Schmidt.

== Works ==
- Johann Adam Schmidt's Handschriftlich hinterlassenes Lehrbuch der Materia medica . Kupffer & Wimmer, Wien 1811 Digital edition by the University and State Library Düsseldorf

== See also ==
- Georg Joseph Beer
- Joseph Barth
- Karl Gustav Himly
