= Francesco Flarer =

Italian ophthalmologist

Francesco Flarer (27 November 1791 – 22 December 1859) was an ophthalmologist born near Merano, South Tyrol, Holy Roman Empire.

He initially planned to study theology at Innsbruck, but instead enrolled to take classes in medicine, later relocating to the University of Landshut. Political turmoil made his stays at both institutions brief, and in 1809 transferred to the University of Pavia. In 1815 he received his degree in medicine, followed by a doctorate in surgery shortly afterwards.

On advice from Antonio Scarpa (1752–1832), he studied ophthalmology in the clinic of Georg Joseph Beer (1763–1821) at the University of Vienna, where he obtained a degree in 1817. Following his return to Pavia, he worked as an assistant in the anatomy laboratory of Bartolomeo Panizza (1785–1867). In 1819 Flarer was appointed professor of theoretical and practical ophthalmology at Pavia. In 1832–33 he was named university rector, and in 1854 was appointed dean of the medical faculty.

Among his written works was a treatise on iritis (De iritide eiusque speciebus earumque curatione) that won an award from the Académie Royale de Médecine of Paris in 1836. Another noted work of his was a study of eyelid/eyelash maladies titled Riflessioni sulla Trichiasi, sulla Distichiasi e sull'Entropio, avuto particolare riguardo ai metodi di Jaeger e di Vaccà (Reflections on trichiasis, distichiasis and entropion, with particular regard to the methods of Friedrich Jäger von Jaxtthal (1784–1871) and Andrea Vaccá Berlinghieri (1772–1826).

Flarer was editor of the medical journal Gazzetta medica di Lombardia.
