= Philipp Franz von Walther =

German surgeon (1782–1849)

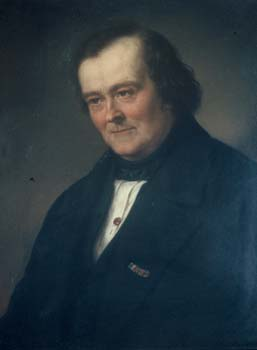
- Born: 3 January 1782; Burrweiler, Holy Roman Empire
- Died: 29 December 1849 (aged 67); Munich, German Empire
- Education: Ludwig-Maximilians-Universität in Landshut (PhD, 1803)
- Scientific career
- Fields: Ophthalmology
- Workplaces: University of Bamberg, Ludwig-Maximilians-Universität in Landshut, University of Bonn, Ludwig-Maximilians-Universität München
- Academic advisors: Georg Joseph Beer; Johann Peter Frank
- Notable students: Johannes Peter Müller

Philipp Franz von Walther (3 January 1782 – 29 December 1849) was a German surgeon and ophthalmologist.

== Biography ==
He was born in Burrweiler. He studied medicine in Vienna under Georg Joseph Beer and Johann Peter Frank, obtaining his medical doctorate in 1803 from the Ludwig-Maximilians-Universität in Landshut. He subsequently served as a professor at the University of Bamberg, the Ludwig-Maximilians-Universität in Landshut, the University of Bonn (1818–1830), and the Ludwig-Maximilians-Universität München (successor of the Ludwig-Maximilians-Universität in Landshut). Among his better known students were Johannes Peter Müller (1801–1858) at the University of Bonn, and Johann Lukas Schönlein (1793–1864) and Cajetan von Textor (1782–1860) at the Ludwig-Maximilians-Universität in Landshut.

Walther is best known for his pioneer work in ophthalmology and ophthalmic surgery. In 1826, he described the first tarsorrhaphy for closure of a portion of the eyelids for partial ectropion. In the treatise Ueber die Hornhautflecken, he gave an early account of corneal opacity.

With Karl Ferdinand von Gräfe (1787–1840), he was co-editor of Journal der Chirurgie und Augenheilkunde, an influential journal of surgery and ophthalmology. Walther is credited with performing numerous experiments involving medical galvanism.

He died in Munich.

== Selected works ==
- Ueber die therapeutische Indication und den Techniscismus der galvanischen Operation, 1803.
- Ueber das Alterthum der Knochenkrankheiten, 1825.
- Ectropicum anguli oculi externi, eine neue Augenkrankheit und die Tarsoraphie, eine neue Augen-Operation (Ectropicum anguli externi oculi, a new eye disease and tarsorrhaphy, a new eye surgery), 1826.
- Ueber die Trepanation nach Kopfverletzungen (On trepanation for head injuries), 1831.
- Die Lehre vom schwarzen Star und seine Heilart; Pathologie und Therapie der Amarose (Pathology and treatment of amaurosis), 1840.
- Ueber die Amaurose nach Superciliar-Verletzungen, 1840.
- Ueber die Revaccination (Involving re-vaccination), 1844.
- Ueber die Hornhautflecken (About spots on the cornea), 1845.
- Kataraktologie, Beobachtung einer Cornea conica im chirurgisch-ophthalmologischen Klinikum in München (Observation of a cornea conica in the surgical eye hospital at Munich), 1846.
- Wieder-Anheilung einer ganz abgehauenen Nase (S.521-235, 1 Taf.). and Nachricht über die Anheilung einer, zwei Stunden lang völlig abgetrennten Nase; ein Sendschreiben des R.Markiewicz an C.F. Graefe (S.536-537).
