= Georg Joseph Beer =

Austrian ophthalmologist

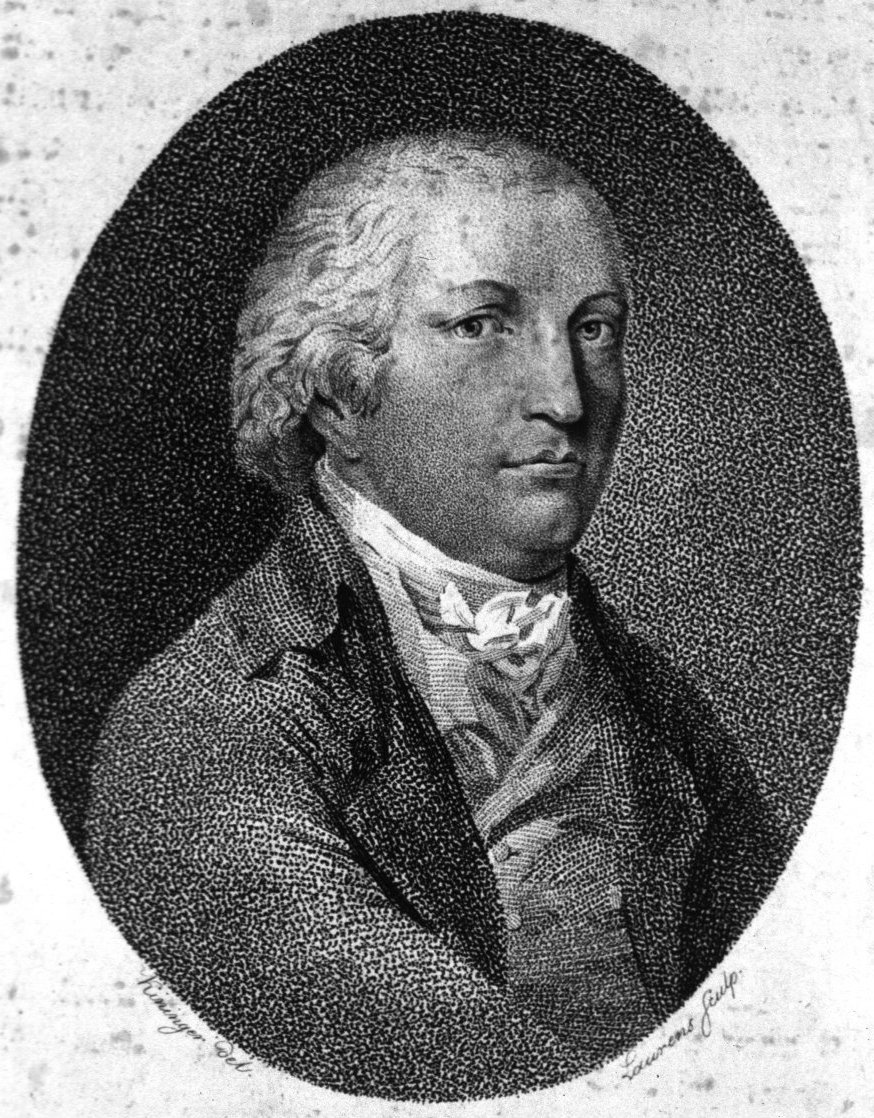
- Georg Joseph Beer (1763–1821)
- Born: 23 December 1763; Vienna, Habsburg Empire
- Died: 11 April 1821 (aged 57); Vienna, Austrian Empire
- Education: University of Vienna (M.D., 1786)
- Known for: Beer's operation
- Scientific career
- Fields: Ophthalmology
- Workplaces: University of Vienna
- Doctoral advisor: Joseph Barth
- Doctoral students: Philipp Franz von Walther; William Mackenzie

Georg Joseph Beer (23 December 1763 – 11 April 1821) was an Austrian ophthalmologist. He is credited with introducing a flap operation for treatment of cataracts (Beer's operation), as well as popularizing the instrument used to perform the surgery (Beer's knife).

== Career ==
Initially a theology student, in 1786 he earned his medical doctorate from the University of Vienna. Under the guidance of Joseph Barth (1745–1818), his primary focus turned to the field of ophthalmology. However, his professional relationship with Barth was never close, and he later referred to his years with Barth as his "years of torture" (Barth – mentor and tormentor). The final break in their relationship was caused by Barth's favour of Johann Adam Schmidt (1759–1809), who later became a renowned ophthalmologist.

Eventually he built a successful practice despite the obstacles created by Barth, who publicly expressed doubts in regard to Beer's qualifications. Beer became a popular teacher, and attracted a number of students who later excelled in the field of ophthalmology. Among his better known pupils were William Mackenzie, Philipp Franz von Walther, Carl Ferdinand von Graefe (1787–1840), Johann Nepomuk Fischer (1777–1847), Konrad Johann Martin Langenbeck (1776–1851), Anton von Rosas (1791–1855), Maximilian Joseph von Chelius (1794–1876), Francesco Flarer (1791–1859) and Christoph Friedrich Jaeger Ritter von Jaxtthal (1784–1871), his future son-in-law.

In 1812, Beer was appointed to the chair of ophthalmology at the University of Vienna. In 1818, he suffered a stroke which left him incapacitated and eventually led to his death three years later. During his career, he sought to liberate ophthalmology from dogmatic beliefs held at the time, and to establish ophthalmology on a foundation of careful observation. His best written work was the celebrated Lehre von den Augenkrankheiten, als Leitfaden zu seinen öffentlichen Vorlesungen entworfen, which was used as an important reference in ophthalmic medicine for many years afterward.
