= Karl Gustav Himly =

German surgeon and ophthalmologist (1772–1837)

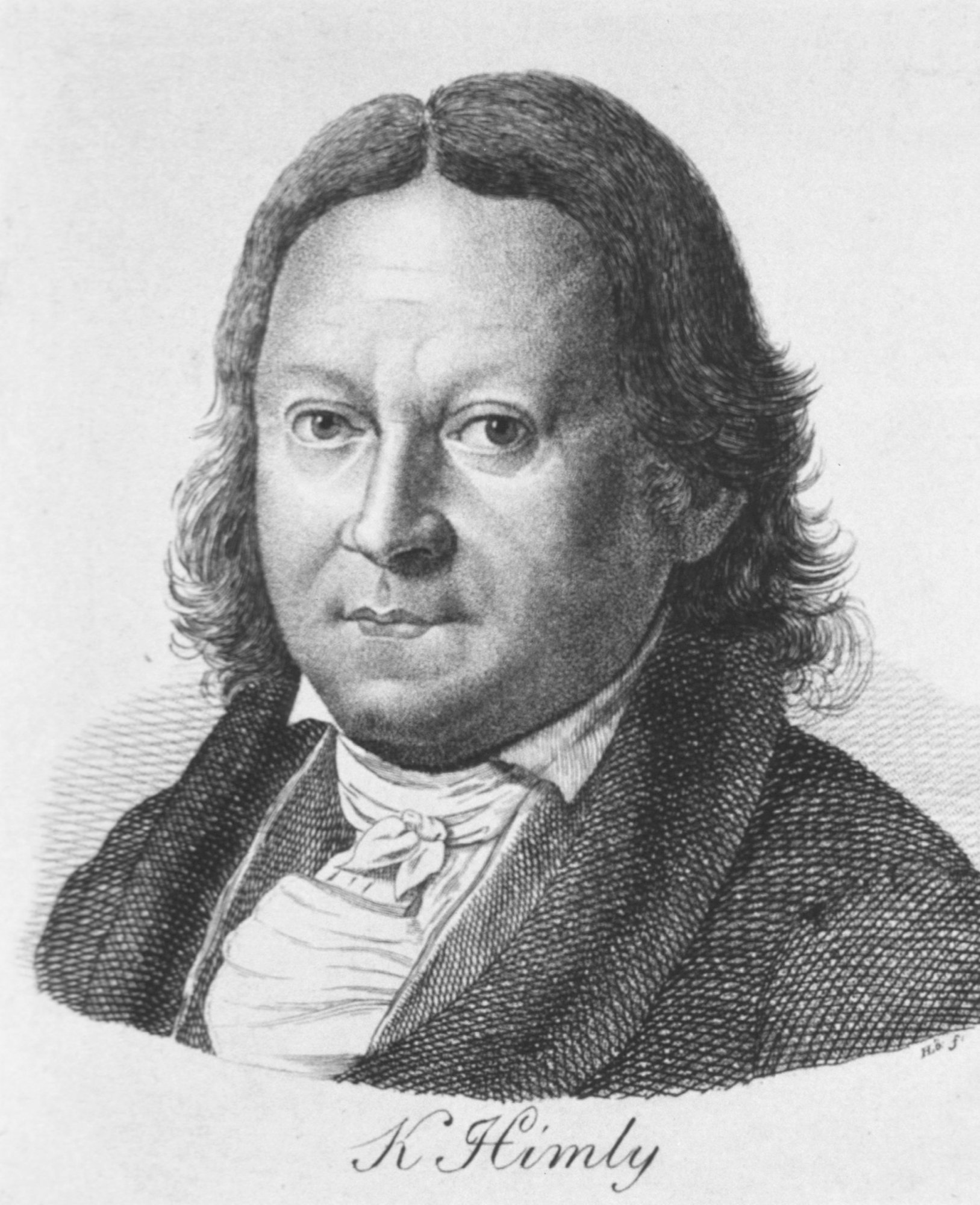
Karl Gustav Himly

Karl Gustav Himly (30 April 1772 – 22 March 1837) was a German surgeon and ophthalmologist from Braunschweig.

He studied medicine at the University of Würzburg under Carl Caspar von Siebold (1736–1807), and at the University of Göttingen with August Gottlieb Richter (1742–1812). In 1795 he became a professor at the hospital in Braunschweig, and in 1801 succeeded Christoph Wilhelm Hufeland (1762–1836) as professor of medicine at the hospital in Jena.

From 1803 he was a professor of surgery at the University of Göttingen, where he worked with Konrad Johann Martin Langenbeck (1776–1851), and his former teacher, August Richter. In 1809, Himly was instrumental in establishing a new hospital in Göttingen. Among his better known students were Karl Friedrich Heusinger (1792–1883), Christian Georg Theodor Ruete (1810–1867) and Friedrich August von Ammon (1799–1861).

Himly was a pioneer in the field of ophthalmology, and is credited for introducing the scientific application of mydriatics into European medicine. In addition, he performed early investigations involving the possibilities of corneal grafting. In 1802, with Johann Adam Schmidt (1759–1809), he began publication of "Ophthalmologische Bibliothek", a journal that became the first magazine dedicated to ophthalmic medicine in Germany. From 1809 until 1814, he published the "Journal für praktische Heilkunde" with Christoph Hufeland.

Himly died in Göttingen in 1837. His son, Ernst August Wilhelm Himly (1800–1881), was a noted physiologist.
