= Thomas Wharton Jones =

Scottish ophthalmologist and physiologist (1808–1891)

Thomas W. Jones
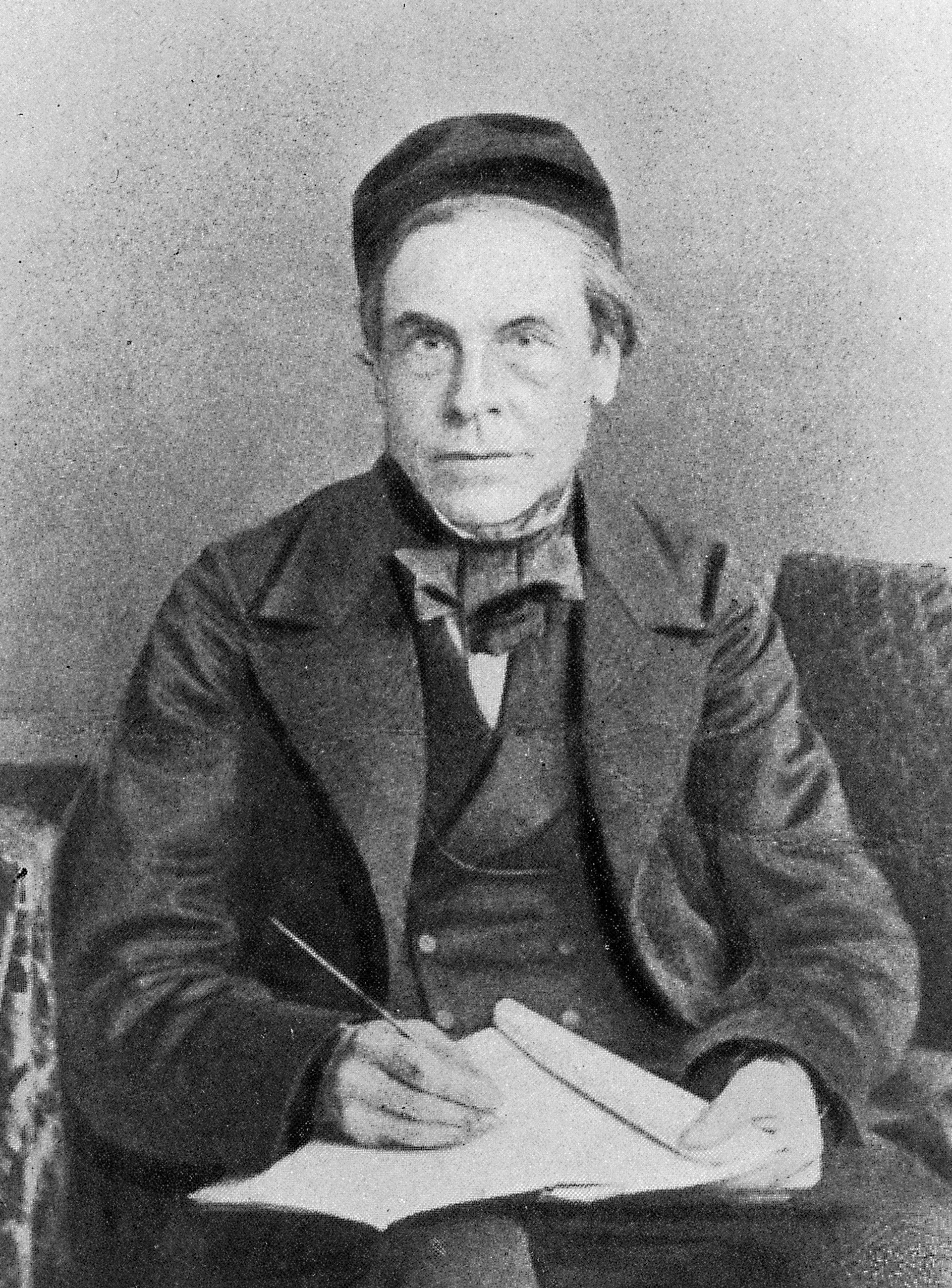
- Born: 9 January 1808; St Andrews, Scotland
- Died: 7 November 1891 (aged 83); Ventnor, England
- Education: University of Edinburgh
- Scientific career
- Fields: Ophthalmologist and physiologist
- Workplaces: University College London; Royal Institution; Charing Cross Hospital
- Academic advisors: William Mackenzie
- Notable students: Thomas Henry Huxley

Thomas Wharton Jones (9 January 1808 – 7 November 1891) was a Scottish ophthalmologist and physiologist.

== Biography ==
Jones's father was Richard Jones, a native of London. Richard Jones had moved north to St Andrews and was working with Her Majesty's Customs for Scotland when Thomas Wharton Jones was born in January 1808. Jones grew up in Scotland and studied medicine at the University of Edinburgh. From 1827 to 1829, he was an assistant to Robert Knox, a lecturer on anatomy at Edinburgh. Around Christmas of 1827, while working for Knox, he purchased a body from William Hare on Knox's behalf, paying £7 10s to Hare. Jones thus became caught up in the scandal surrounding the notorious body-snatchers Burke and Hare, but was cleared by the investigating committee.^{,} After this, he went to Glasgow, where he worked with William Mackenzie. Jones contributed the anatomical drawings of sections of the eye that appeared in Mackenzie's classic treatise.

Jones travelled to Cork in 1835, and for a time he engaged in medical practice there, devoting himself chiefly to diseases of the eye and ear. In 1835, he made the discovery of the germinal vesicle in the mammalian ovum, and in 1837, described the origin of the chorion. In 1837 he visited the principal universities of the Continent, and settled in London in the following year, where he set up practice as an oculist. In 1847, Jones examined a primitive ophthalmoscope devised by Charles Babbage, but found it of little value. In 1851, Jones was appointed Professor of Ophthalmic Medicine and Surgery at University College London. He occupied this post for 30 years until the beginning of 1881, when medical problems forced him to retire to Ventnor. He stayed in Ventnor until his death in 1891.

Jones was a lecturer on physiology at Charing Cross Hospital, Fullerian professor of physiology in the Royal Institution (1851–55), and ophthalmic surgeon to the hospital.

In 1872, on behalf of the Camden Society, Jones edited an account of the life and death of Bishop Bedell of Kilmore, who was an ancestral kinsman who died in the Irish Rebellion of 1641.

Jones disagreed with the Darwinian theory of evolution, regarding it as a "mere conceit unsanctioned by science," and published a book in 1876 propounding this view.

== Awards ==
- 1850: Astley Cooper Prize Essay on State of the Blood and Bloodvessels in Inflammation
- 1851: Actonian Prize Essay on The Wisdom and Beneficence of the Almighty as displayed in the Sense of Vision; prize of 100 guineas (£105), awarded by the Royal Institution.

== Selected publications ==
- The principles and practice of ophthalmic medicine and surgery, London: John Churchill, 1847; American ed., ed. by Isaac Hays, Philadelphia: Lea and Blanchard, 1847; 2nd ed., London: John Churchill, 1855; 2nd American ed., ed. by Edward Hartshorne, Philadelphia, Blanchard & Lea, 1856; 3rd and rev. American ed., based on 2nd British ed., ed. Walter F. Atlee, Philadelphia: Blanchard and Lea, 1863; 3rd ed., London: John Churchill, 1865.
- A catechism of the medicine and surgery of the eye and ear, for the clinical use of hospital students, London: John Churchill, 1857.
- A catechism of the physiology and philosophy of body, sense, and mind: For use in schools and colleges, and in private study, London: John Churchill, 1858.
- Failure of sight from railway and other injuries of the spine and head; its nature and treatment, with a physiological and pathological disquisition into the influence of the vaso-motor nerves on the circulation of the blood in the extreme vessels, London: Walton, 1869.
- A true relation of the life and death of the Right Reverend father in God William Bedell, lord bishop of Kilmore in Ireland; edited from a ms. in the Bodleian library, Oxford, and amplified with genealogical and historical chapters, compiled from original sources, with William Bedell, Westminster: Camden Society, 1872.
- Evolution of the human race from apes, and of apes from lower animals, a doctrine unsanctioned by science, London: Smith, Elder & Co., 1876.

Jones also wrote various papers on physiology, published in the Philosophical Transactions and elsewhere.

== Society Affiliations ==
- Fellow of the Royal College of Surgeons
- Foreign Member, Medical Society of Vienna
- Foreign Member, Medical Society of Copenhagen
- Foreign Member, Société de Biologie of Paris

Academic offices
Preceded by William Withey Gull	Fullerian Professor of Physiology; 1851–1855	Succeeded by Thomas Henry Huxley
