= Georg Prochaska =

Czech-Austrian anatomist, ophthalmologist and physiologist

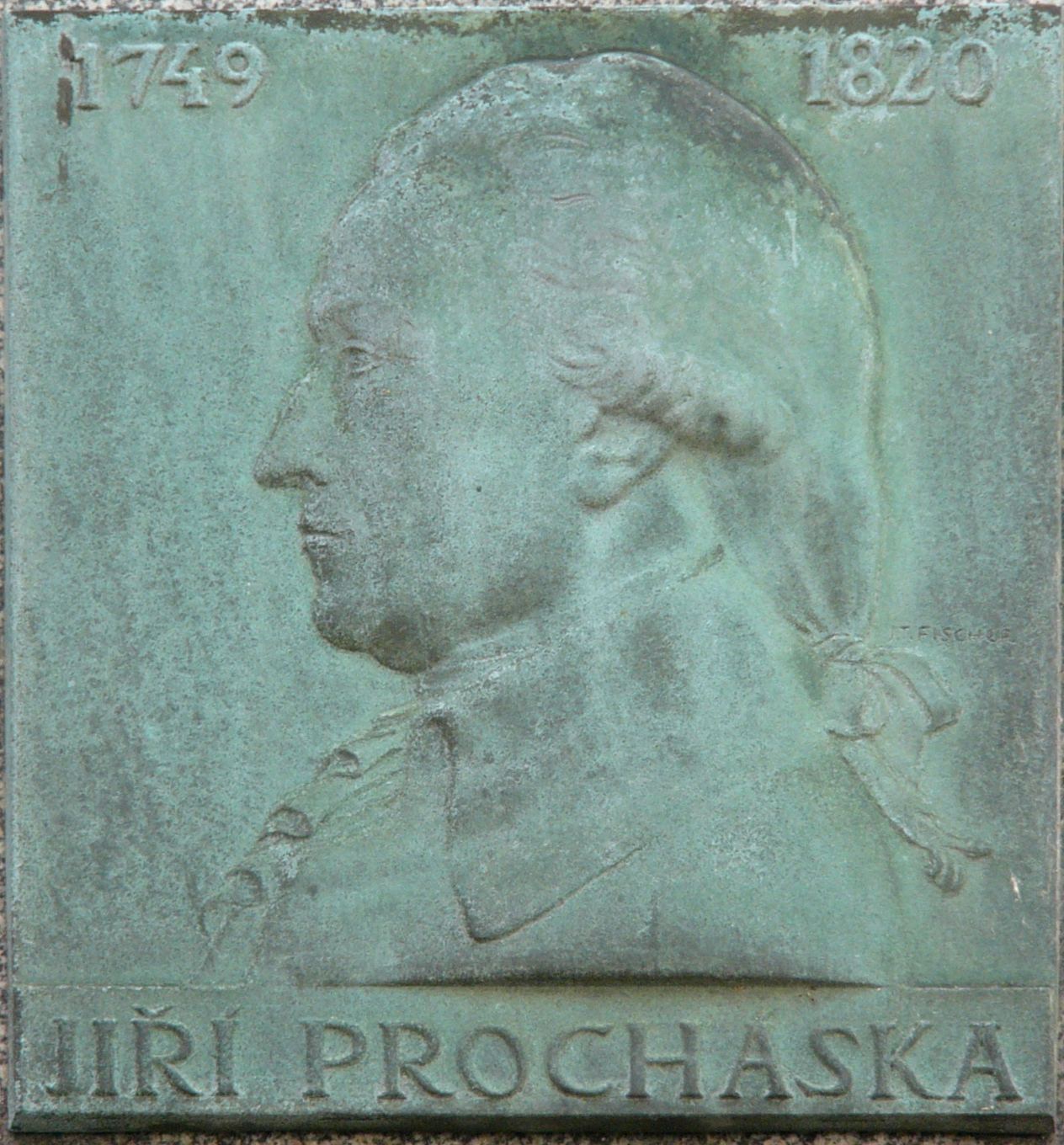
Plaque of Georg Procháska by Jan Tomáš Fischer at former Jesuits grammar school building in Jezuitské Square in Znojmo

Georg Prochaska (sometimes also Juri, Jiří or Georgius Prochaska; Czech: Jiří Procháska; 10 April 1749 – 17 July 1820) was a Czech-Austrian anatomist, ophthalmologist, physiologist, writer and university professor. He wrote the first genuine textbook on physiology and created the concept of nerve conduction among other theories. He was a staunch promoter of the modern reflex theory.

== Life ==
Prochaska was born on 10 April 1749 in Blížkovice in Bohemia, Habsburg monarchy. He studied medicine in Prague and Vienna, and from 1778 until 1791 was a professor of anatomy, physiology and ophthalmology at the University of Prague. In 1791 he succeeded Joseph Barth as professor of anatomy and ophthalmology at the University of Vienna. He died on 17 July 1820 in Vienna.

== Discoveries ==
Prochaska was a pioneer in the field of neurophysiology, being remembered for developing a comprehensive theory of reflex action involving the concepts of "vis nervosa" and "sensorium commune". "Vis nervosa" was described as a latent nervous force possessed in the nerves, and the term sensorium commune was defined as the point of reflection between the sensory and motor nerves.

Prochaska used the term vis nervosa as a direct analogy to Isaac Newton's "vis gravitans", due to his belief that "vis nervosa" was an elemental form of energy, that could not be observed except through its effects such as reflexes and reflections, adhering to natural laws that could be described (as could Newton's theories of gravitation), but at the same time were unexplainable.

Prochaska described the "sensorium commune" as the core mechanism of the reflex. It involved the spinal cord, medulla oblongata and the basal ganglia, and had the ability to reflect sensory impressions into the motor nervous system by definite laws unique to itself, and also independent of consciousness. Prochaska demonstrated that reflex worked without a brain, but could not work without a spinal cord, and summarized that voluntary behavior was a brain function, while reflex was spinal-based.

One of Prochaska's better-known writings is Dissertation on the Functions of the Nervous System, a work that was later combined with John Augustus Unzer's The Principles of Physiology as one publication, being translated and edited by English physiologist Thomas Laycock (1812–1876).
