= Johann Nepomuk Fischer =

Austrian ophthalmologist (1777-1847)

Johann Nepomunk Fischer
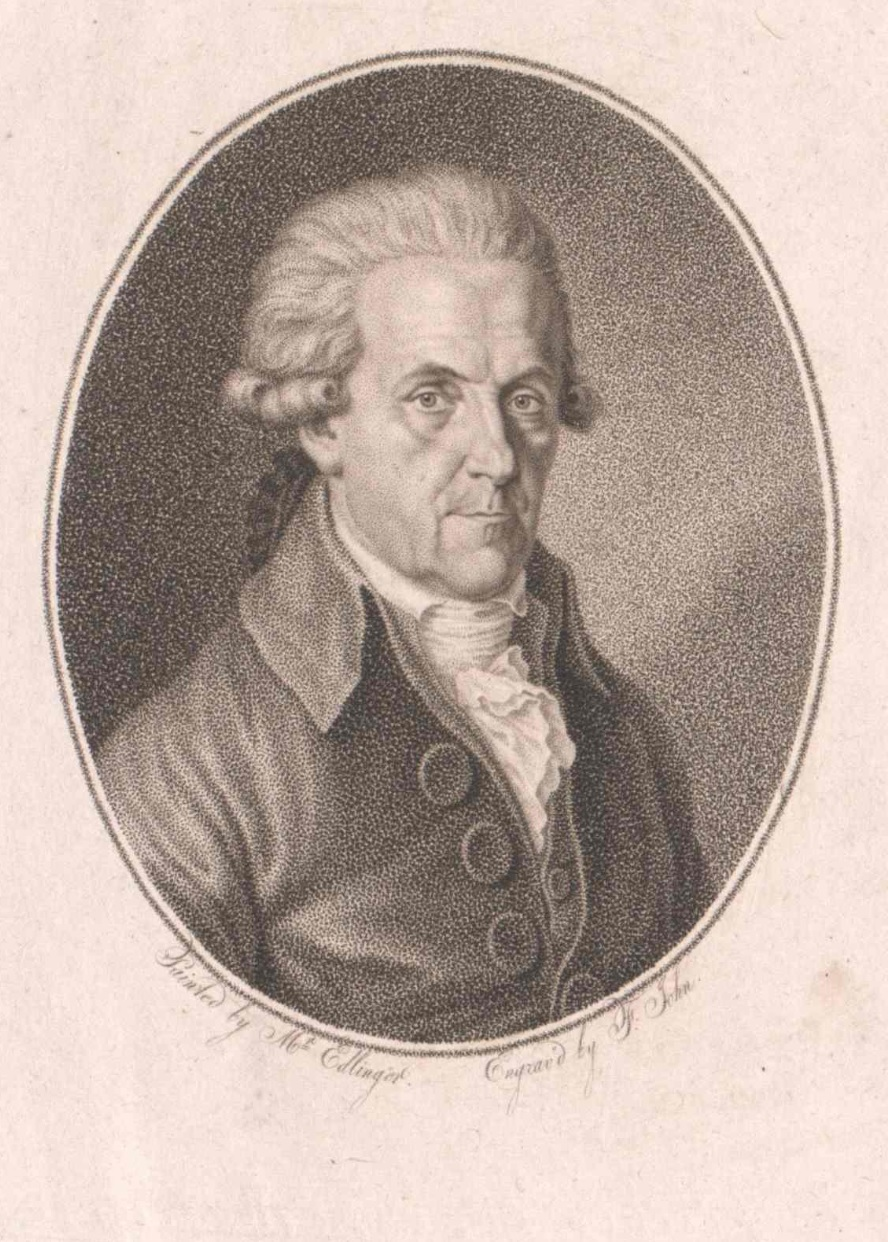
- Johann Nepomunk Fischer
- Born: Johann Nepomunk Fischer; 29 May 1777; Rumburk
- Died: 17 October 1847 (aged 70); Prague, (Present day Czech Republic)
- Scientific career
- Fields: Ophthalmology

Johann Nepomuk Fischer (29 May 1777, Rumburk – 17 October 1847, Prague) was an Austrian ophthalmologist. He is considered to be the founder of modern ophthalmology in Bohemia.

He studied medicine at the University of Vienna as a student of Georg Joseph Beer. In 1806 he received his doctorate in medicine, and several years later, was named head of the newly founded eye clinic in Prague (1814). In 1830 he attained the chair of ophthalmology at the University of Prague. Among his better-known students was Carl Ferdinand von Arlt.

== Selected works ==
- Klinischer Unterricht in der Augenheilkunde, 1832 – Clinical teaching in ophthalmology.
- Die Krankheiten der durchsichtigen Hornhaut in systematischer Ordnung, 1833 – Diseases of the transparent cornea in systematic order.
- Abbildungen des Thraenenschlauches und einer merkwürdigen Metamorphose der Regenbogenhaut, 1836 – Pictures of the lacrimal apparatus and a strange metamorphosis of the iris.
- Lehrbuch der gesammten Entzündungen und organischen Krankheiten des menschichen Auges, seiner Schutz- und Hilfsorgane, 1846 – Textbook of inflammation and organic diseases of the human eye.
