= Blížkovice =

- Market town
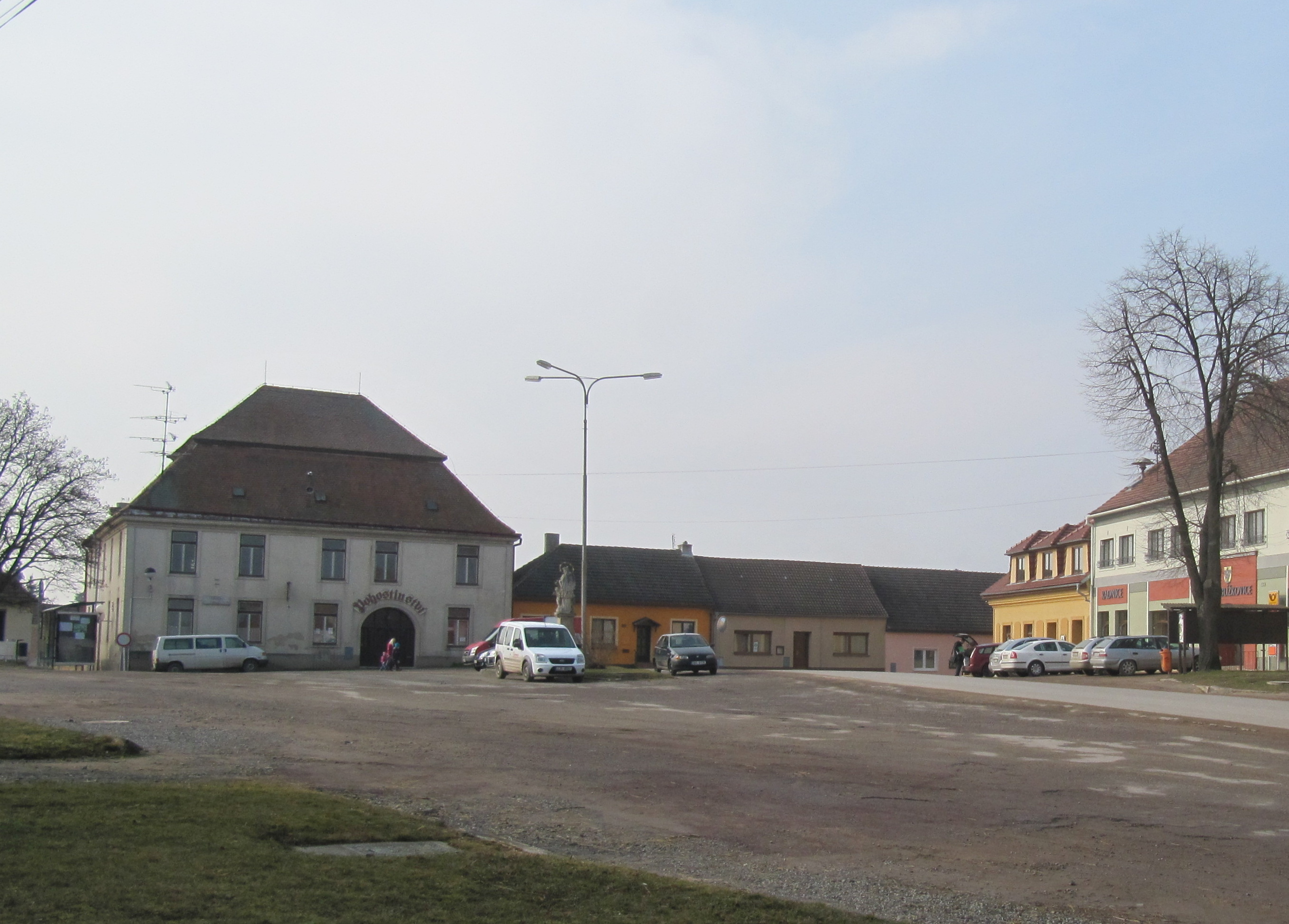
- Centre of Blížkovice

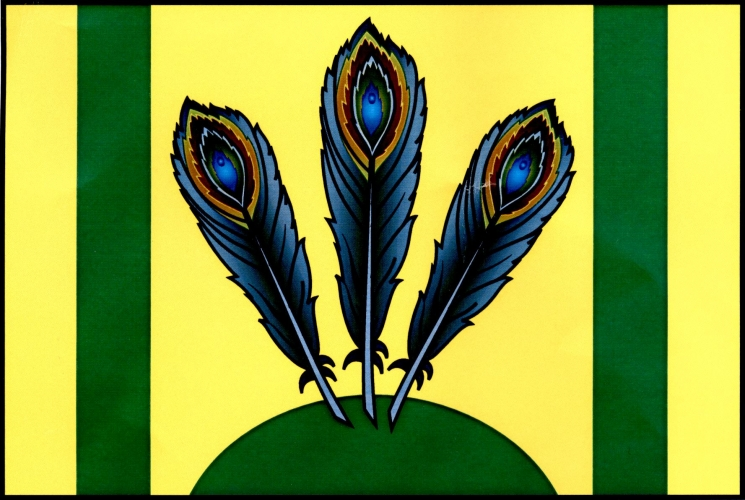
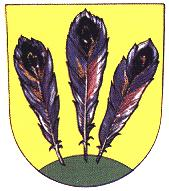
- Flag Coat of arms

- Location in the Czech Republic
- Coordinates: 48°59′59″N 15°50′5″E
- Country: Czech Republic
- Region: South Moravian
- District: Znojmo
- First mentioned: 1349

Area
  - Total: 20.81 km^{2} (8.03 sq mi)
- Elevation: 398 m (1,306 ft)

Population (2026-01-01)
  - Total: 1,204
  - Density: 57.86/km^{2} (149.8/sq mi)
- Time zone: UTC+1 (CET)
  - Summer (DST): UTC+2 (CEST)
- Postal code: 671 55
- Website: www.mestysblizkovice.cz

Blížkovice (Czech pronunciation: [ˈbliːʒkovɪtsɛ]; German: Lispitz) is a market town in Znojmo District in the South Moravian Region of the Czech Republic. It has about 1,200 inhabitants.

== Geography ==
Blížkovice is located about 21 kilometres (13 mi) northwest of Znojmo and 59 km (37 mi) southwest of Brno. It lies in the Jevišovice Uplands. The highest point is at 446 m (1,463 ft) above sea level. The Jevišovka River flows through the market town. There are several fishponds in the municipal territory.

== History ==
Due to the triangular shape of the square, there are opinions that there was a Slavic settlement here already during the time of Great Moravia (in the 9th century). The first written mention of Blížkovice is from 1349, when it was already referred to as a market town. There were originally two settlements, one called Městys Blížkovice ('the market town of Blížkovice') and one called Ves Blížkovice ('the village of Blížkovice'). It is unique that two settlements with the same name arose next to each other. In 1919, they were merged into one municipality.

== Demographics ==
Historical population

Year	Pop.	±%
1869	1,194	—
1880	1,270	+6.4%
1890	1,295	+2.0%
1900	1,277	−1.4%
1910	1,345	+5.3%

Year	Pop.	±%
1921	1,383	+2.8%
1930	1,405	+1.6%
1950	1,210	−13.9%
1961	1,271	+5.0%
1970	1,173	−7.7%

Year	Pop.	±%
1980	1,122	−4.3%
1991	1,225	+9.2%
2001	1,251	+2.1%
2011	1,185	−5.3%
2021	1,168	−1.4%

Source: Censuses

== Transport ==
The I/38 road (part of the European route E59) from Jihlava to Znojmo runs through the municipal territory.

Blížkovice is located on the railway line Znojmo–Okříšky.

== Sights ==
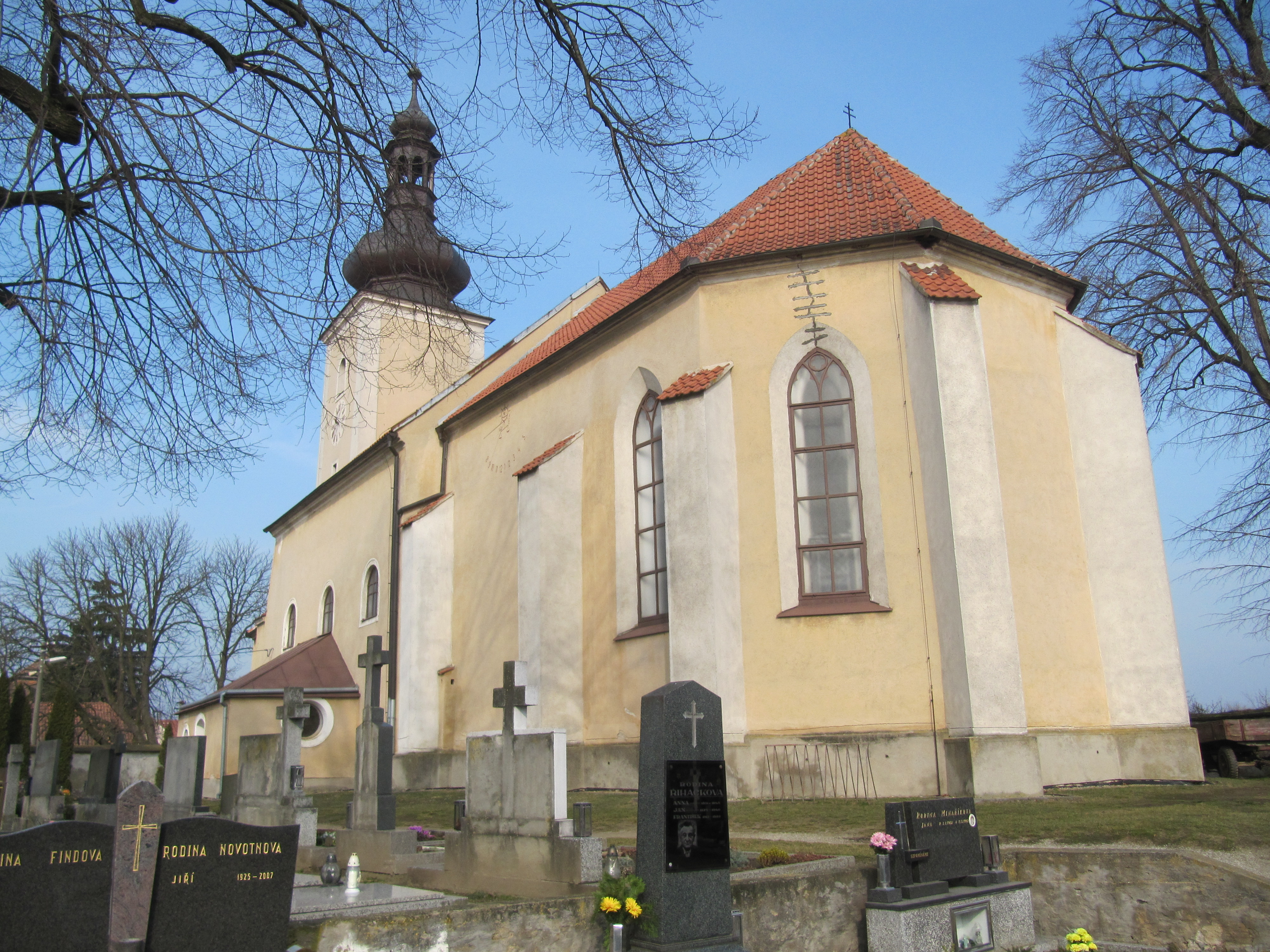
Church of Saint Bartholomew

The main landmark of Blížkovice is the Church of Saint Bartholomew. It has a Romanesque core from around 1200. In the first quarter of the 14th century, it was extended in the Gothic style. Renaissance modifications were made in the late 16th century and Baroque modifications were made in the second half of the 18th century.

== Notable people ==
- Georg Prochaska (1749–1820), Czech-Austrian medical doctor
