= Anton von Rosas =

Austrian ophthalmologist

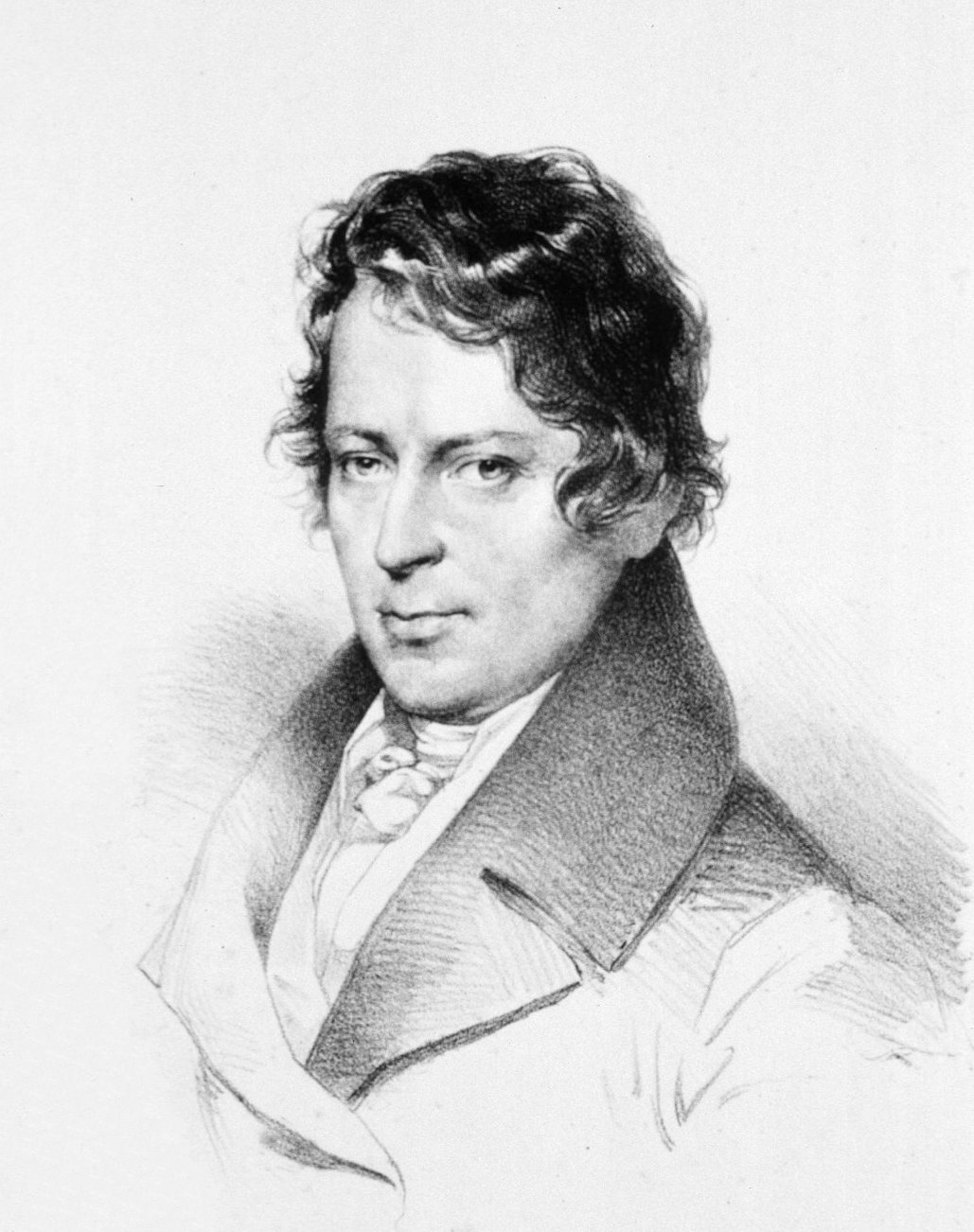
Anton von Rosas; (1834 lithograph by Josef Kriehuber).

Anton von Rosas (23 December 1791 – 31 May 1855) was an Austrian ophthalmologist born in Pécs, Hungary.

He studied medicine at the Universities of Pest and Vienna, earning his doctorate in 1814. He later became an assistant to Georg Joseph Beer (1763-1821) at the University Eye Clinic in Vienna, and from 1819 to 1821 was director of the ophthalmology clinic at the University of Padua. In 1821 he returned to Vienna as successor to the late Dr. Beer.

From 1821 to 1853 he was professor of ophthalmology and director of the eye clinic at the University of Vienna. He is credited with making several improvements at the clinic, including establishment of a year-round ambulatory clinic. Among his written works was a three volume ophthalmological textbook titled Handbuch der theoretischen und practischen Augenheilkunde.

A street in the Meidling district of Vienna called Rosasgasse is named in his honor.

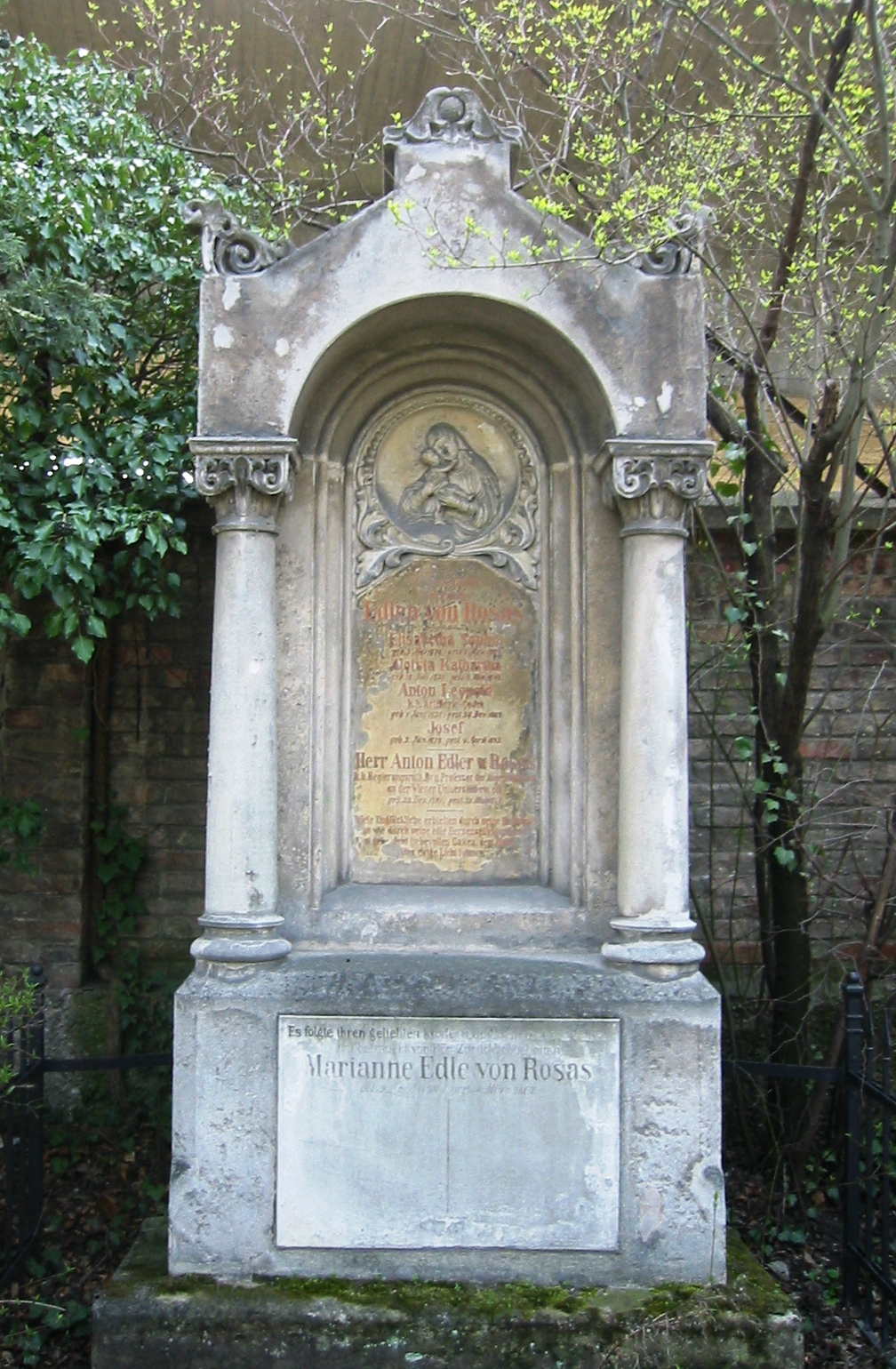
Grave of Anton von Rosas at St. Marx Cemetery, Vienna

== Schopenhauer's imputation ==
Schopenhauer claimed that Professor Rosas committed plagiarism against him. Schopenhauer made this claim in two of his books: On Vision and Colors, § 1, and On the Will in Nature, "Physiology and Pathology." In the latter book, Schopenhauer showed in detail how Professor Rosas, "...adopted his [Schopenhauer's] phrases exactly and numerously. The main example cited is Rosas's Textbook of Ophthalmology (1830) where passages are matched [in many cases word for word] with those from 'On Vision and Colors' (1816)."

== Published works ==
- Handbuch der theoretischen und practischen Augenheilkunde, three volumes (1830).
- Kurzgefaßte Geschichte der Wiener Hochschule im Allgemeinen und der medicinischen Facultät derselben insbesondere (1843-47).
