= Friedrich Jäger von Jaxtthal =

Austrian ophthalmologist

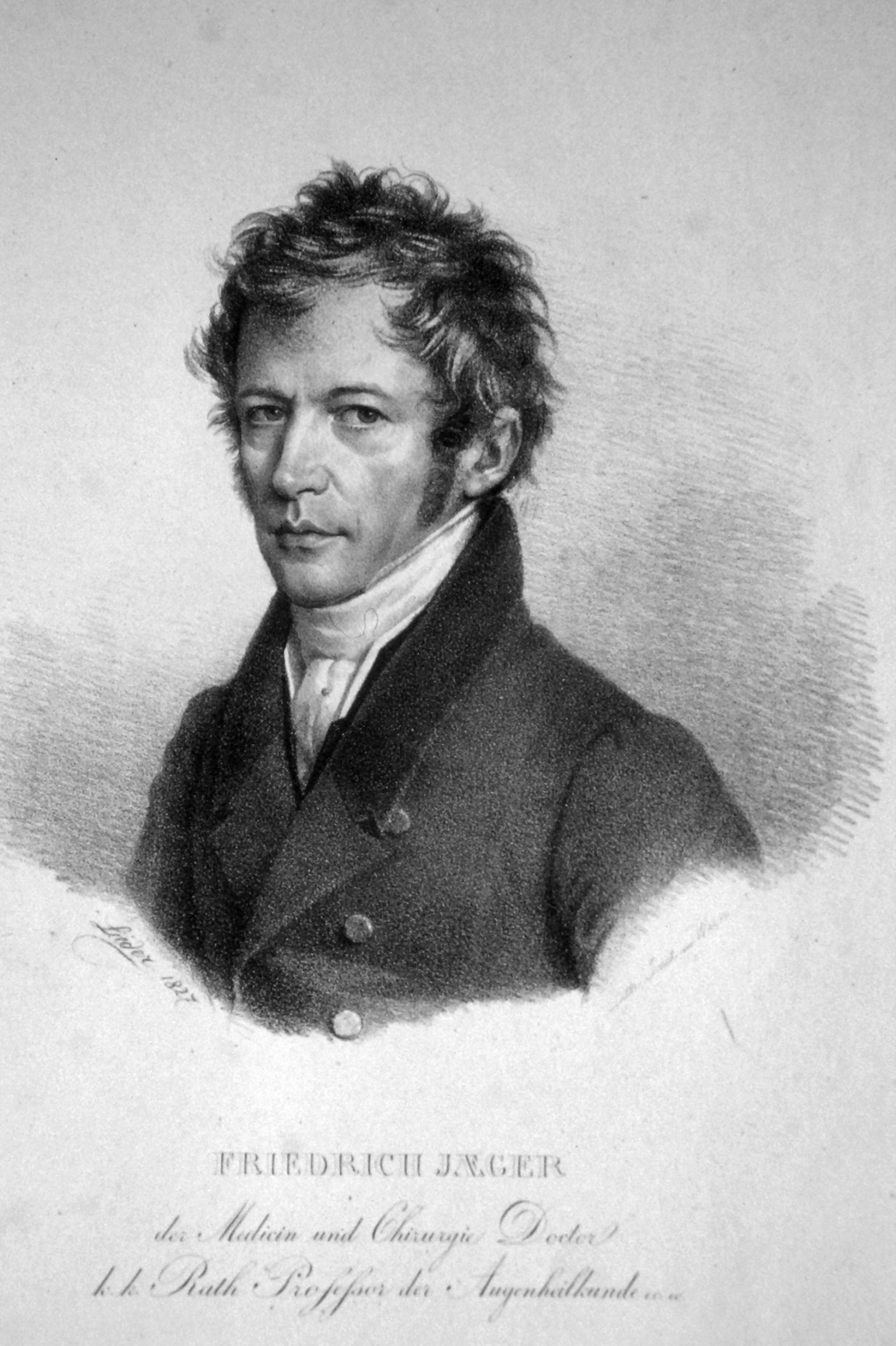
Friedrich Jäger von Jaxtthal, 1827

Christoph Friedrich Jäger Ritter von Jaxtthal (4 September 1784 – 25 December 1871) was an Austrian ophthalmologist who was a native of Kirchberg an der Jagst.

== Early life and education ==
He studied medicine in Vienna and Landshut, and in 1809 became a physician in the Napoleonic Wars. He later returned to Vienna, where in 1812 he received his medical degree at the university.

== Career ==
In Vienna he served as an assistant to ophthalmologist Georg Joseph Beer (1763–1821), who would become his future father-in-law. From 1825 until 1848, he was a professor of ophthalmology at the Josephinum (school for military surgeons) in Vienna.

Friedrich Jäger von Jaxtthal was an influential physician and surgeon of ophthalmic medicine. Two of his more famous students in Vienna were Frédéric Jules Sichel (1802–1868) and Albrecht von Graefe (1828–1870). He was a personal physician to Prince Metternich (1773–1859), and the father of ophthalmologist Eduard Jäger von Jaxtthal (1818–1884).

== Associated eponym ==
- "Bartisch-Jaeger method": Historical eponym for surgical removal of the eyeball (bulbus oculi) for cancer of the eye. Named with German physician, Georg Bartisch (1535–1607). The procedure would later be improved upon by Italian ophthalmologist Francesco Flarer.

== Selected writings ==
- De karatonyxide, Vienna, 1812.
- De ägyptische Augenentzündung, Vienna, 1840.

== See also ==
- Jäger (disambiguation)
