= Frédéric Jules Sichel =

German-born French physician and entomologist

Jules Sichel
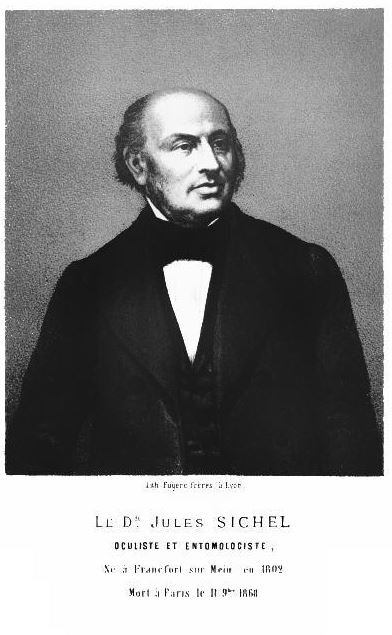
- Born: Frédéric Jules Sichel; 14 May 1802; Frankfurt am Main, Holy Roman Empire
- Died: 11 November 1868 (aged 66); Paris, France
- Occupations: Ophthalmologist; Physician; Entomologist

Frédéric Jules Sichel (14 May 1802 – 11 November 1868) was a German-born, French medical doctor and entomologist.

Frédéric Jules Sichel was born in Frankfurt am Main. From 1820, he studied medicine at the universities of Würzburg, Tübingen and Berlin, then from 1825 to 1829 worked as an assistant to ophthalmologist Friedrich Jäger von Jaxtthal in Vienna. In 1829 he relocated to Paris, where in 1833 he received his doctorate with the dissertation-thesis "Propositions générales sur l'ophthalmologie, suivies de l'histoire de l'ophthalmie rhumatismale". In 1833 he acquired French citizenship.

In 1832 he established the first ophthalmic clinic in Paris, and for a period of time, gave courses in ophthalmology at the Hôpital Saint-Antoine. He is credited with bringing modern ophthalmology to France from Austria and Germany. Sichel trained several famous ophthalmologists (Louis-Auguste Desmarres, Charles Deval, Charles de Hübsch and Wiktor Szokalski) at his Paris clinic. He was interested in oriental languages and archaeology, writing extensively on the seals of Roman doctors. In entomology he specialized in Hymenoptera – his collection being donated to the Muséum National d'Histoire Naturelle.

== Death ==
Frédéric Jules Sichel died in Paris on 11 November 1868.

== Publications ==
Archeology

- Nouveau recueil de pierres sigillaires d'oculistes romains pour la plupart inédites... (V. Masson et fils, Paris, 1866).

Medical

- Traité de l'ophthalmie, la cataracte et l'amaurose, pour servir de supplément au Traité des maladies des yeux de Weller (G. Baillière, Paris, 1837).
- Mémoire sur le glaucome (imprimerie de N.-J. Gregoir, Brussels, 1842).
- Iconographie ophthalmologique, ou description... des maladies de l'organe de la vue... Text accompagné d'un atlas de 80 planches... (J.-B. Baillière et fils, Paris, 1852-1859).

Entomology

- Guide de la chasse des hyménoptères (Deyrolle fils, Paris, 1859, new edition in 1868).
- Catalogus specierum generis Scolia (sensu latiori), continens specierum diagnoses, descriptiones synonymiamque, additis annotationibus explanatoriis criticisque conscripserunt Henricus de Saussure... (Catalogue des espèces de l'ancien genre Scolia, contenant les diagnoses, les descriptions et la synonymie des espèces, avec des remarques explicatives et critiques) (V. Masson et fils, Paris, 1864).

== Sources ==
Translated with minor additions from French Wikipedia

- Anthony Musgrave (1932). Bibliography of Australian Entomology, 1775-1930, with biographical notes on authors and collectors, Royal Zoological Society of News South Wales (Sydney) : viii + 380.
