= Karl Friedrich Heusinger =

German pathologist (1792–1883)

Karl Friedrich Heusinger (28 February 1792 – 5 May 1883) was a German pathologist who was a native of Farnroda.

He studied medicine in Jena and Marburg, and afterwards was an assistant to Karl Gustav Himly (1772–1837) at the University of Göttingen. In 1813 he served as a military doctor in the Prussian Army, and later was a professor at the Universities of Jena (from 1821), Würzburg (from 1824) and Marburg (1829–83).

Heusinger was a pioneer in the field of comparative pathology. In 1829 he published an influential work on physical and psychological anthropology titled Grundriß der physischen und psychischen Anthropologie. Among his other writings was a German translation of François Magendie's (1783-1855) Précis élémentaire de physiologie, and letters of correspondence with naturalist Charles Darwin. He also wrote a remarkable review of geophagy, titled Die sogenannte Geophagie oder tropische (besser: Malaria-) Chlorose als Krankheit aller Länder und Klimate.

== Selected writings ==
- Entzündung und Vergrößerung der Milz, (Inflammation and enlargement of the spleen), Eisenach 1820 und 1823.
- Grundriß der physischen und psychischen Anthropologie. Eisenach 1829. (Sketch of physical and psychological anthropology).
- Grundriß der Encyklopädie und Methodologie der Natur- und Heilkunde. Eisenach 1839.
- Recherches de pathologie comparée. Kassel 1844–53, two volumes (Research on comparative pathology).
- Die sogenannte Geophagie oder tropische (besser: Malaria-) Chlorose als Krankheit aller Länder und Klimate. - The so-called geophagy, or, tropical (better: malaria) chlorosis as a disease of all lands and climes.
