= Louis-Auguste Desmarres =

French ophthalmologist

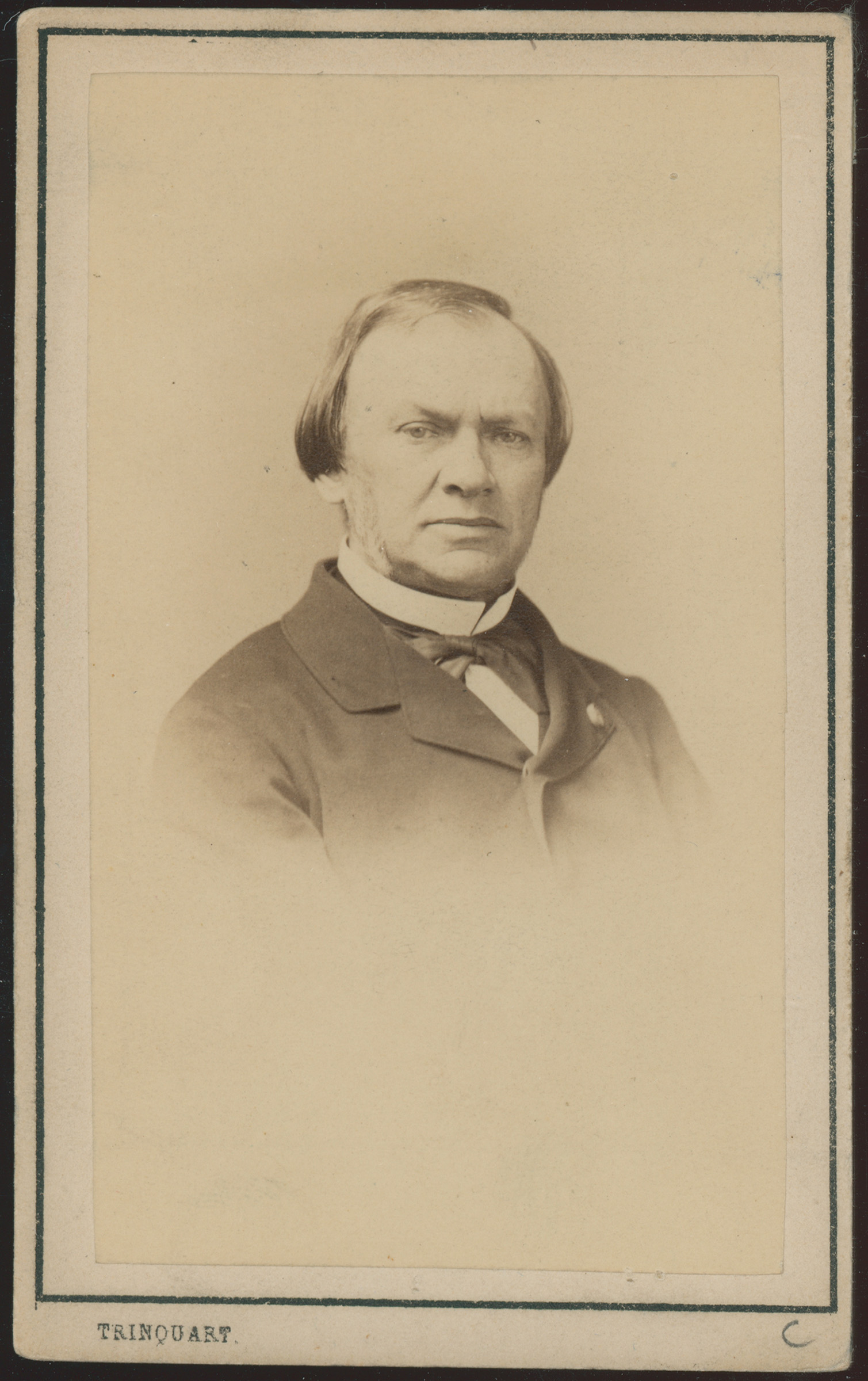
Louis-Auguste Desmarres

Louis-Auguste Desmarres (September 22, 1810 – August 22, 1882) was a French ophthalmologist born in Évreux, Eure.

== Background ==
After obtaining his medical degree he became an assistant to Frédéric Jules Sichel (1802–1868) in Paris. He worked as a physician in the hospitals of Paris, and was a teacher to Swiss ophthalmologist Johann Friedrich Horner (1831–1886).

Desmarres was one of the better known ophthalmic surgeons in 19th century France, and is remembered for an important textbook on diseases of the eye called Traité théorique et pratique des maladies des yeux (1847). He is credited for introducing a surgical procedure for pterygium, and has a number of surgical instruments named after him, including: "Desmarres curved lid retractor", "Desmarres corneal dissector" and "Desmarres chalazion forceps". His name is also associated with "Desmarres' dacryoliths", defined as concretions consisting of Nocardia species, located in the lacrimal ducts.

He died in Neuilly-sur-Seine.

== Publications ==
- Mémoire sur une nouvelle méthode d'employer le nitrate d'argent dans quelques ophtalmies, éd. Garnier, Paris, (1842)
- Traité théorique et pratique des maladies des yeux, éd. G. Baillière, Paris, (1847)
