= Johann Friedrich Horner =

Swiss ophthalmologist (1831–1886)

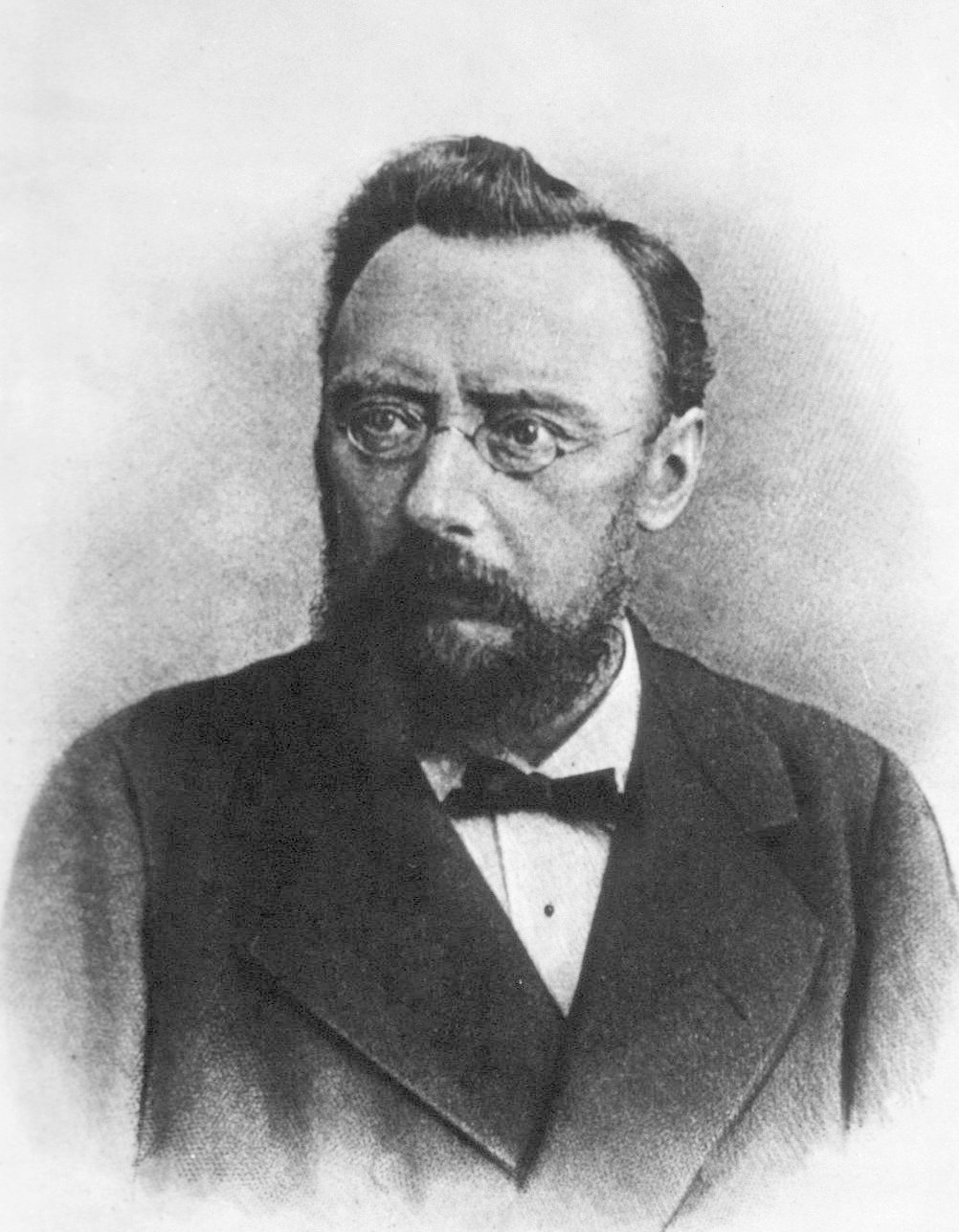
Johann Friedrich Horner

Johann Friedrich Horner (27 March 1831 – 20 December 1886) was an ophthalmologist based at the University of Zurich, Switzerland.

== Biography ==
Horner was born in Zurich. After receiving his medical degree from the University of Zurich in 1854, he continued his studies in Vienna, where he learned ophthalmoscopy from Eduard Jäger von Jaxtthal (1818–1884), and in Berlin, where he served as an assistant to ophthalmologist Albrecht von Graefe (1828–1870). It was during this time that Horner decided to become an ophthalmologist himself. He returned to Zurich in 1856, and later opened his own eye clinic named "Hottinghof".

Horner became a full professor of ophthalmology in 1873. After his death in 1886, his position at the University of Zurich was filled by Otto Haab (1850–1931).

Horner's syndrome, a disorder of the sympathetic nervous system, was named after him following his description of the condition in 1869. His name is also associated with "Horner's muscle", the lacrimal portion of the orbicularis oculi muscle that is sometimes referred to as the "tensor tarsi muscle". With Alexios Trantas (1867–1960), the "Horner-Trantas spots" are named, being defined as small whitish-yellow chalky concretions of the conjunctiva around the corneal limbus

He was the author of numerous articles on ophthalmic medicine, published in Carl Wilhelm von Zehender's Klinische Monatsblatt für Augenheilkunde.
