= Alexios Trantas =

Alexios Trantas (March 1867 – 1960) was a Greek ophthalmologist born in Vourbiani, Epirus.

In 1891 he obtained his doctorate in Athens, continuing his education in Paris under Photinos Panas (1832–1903), Louis de Wecker (1832–1906) and Xavier Galezowski (1832–1907). In 1894 he founded an ophthalmology clinic at the "Greek hospital" in Constantinople, serving as director of this institute until 1922. From 1924 he worked as an ophthalmologist in Piraeus.

In 1898 he was the first physician to study the iridocorneal angle in a living human. With Swiss ophthalmologist Johann Friedrich Horner (1831–1886), "Horner-Trantas spots" are named, which are defined as small white-yellow chalky concretions of the conjunctiva around the corneal limbus.
