= Karl Ferdinand von Gräfe =

German pioneer of plastic surgery (1787–1840)

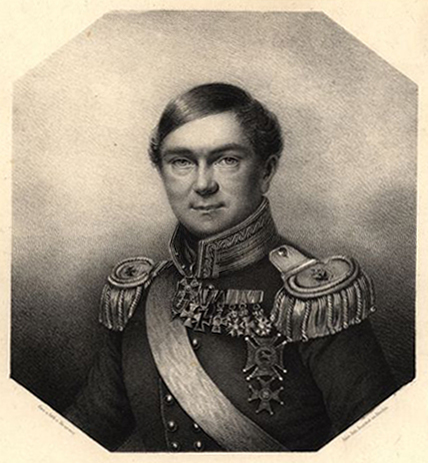
Lithograph of Karl Ferdinand von Gräfe

Karl Ferdinand von Gräfe, (Note: Gräfe is often Anglicized to Graefe (See the article on Ä).) (8 March 1787 – 4 July 1840) was a German surgeon from Warsaw.

He was the father of ophthalmologist Albrecht von Graefe (1828–1870) and grandfather of politician Albrecht von Graefe (1868-1933).

== Biography ==
Gräfe studied medicine at Halle and Leipzig, and after obtaining his licence from Leipzig, he was in 1807 appointed a private physician to Duke Alexius of Anhalt-Bernburg. In 1811, he became a professor of surgery and director of the ophthalmological institute at the University of Berlin. His lectures at the University of Berlin attracted students from all parts of Europe. During the Sixth Coalition against Napoleon, he was a superintendent of military hospitals.

When peace was concluded in 1815, Gräfe resumed his professorial duties. He was also appointed physician to the general staff of the Prussian army, and he became a director of the Friedrich Wilhelm Institute and of the Medico-Chirurgical Academy (Charité).

Gräfe died suddenly at Hanover, where he had been called to operate on the eyes of the crown prince. His grave is preserved in the Protestant Friedhof II der Jerusalems- und Neuen Kirchengemeinde (Cemetery No. II of the congregations of Jerusalem's Church and New Church) in Berlin-Kreuzberg, south of Hallesches Tor.

He was a pioneer of plastic and reconstructive surgery, and a founder of German rhinoplastic surgery. He developed his own techniques in regards to rhinoplasty, being modifications of the Italian methods of Gasparo Tagliacozzi (1545–1599) as well as Indian surgical practices from long ago. He also made contributions towards the development of cleft palate repair, and was a pioneer of eyelid surgery, coining the term "blepharoplasty" in 1818. He is also reputed to have carried out the first reported clitoridectomy in the Western Europe, which was done on a teenage girl regarded as an "imbecile" who was masturbating.

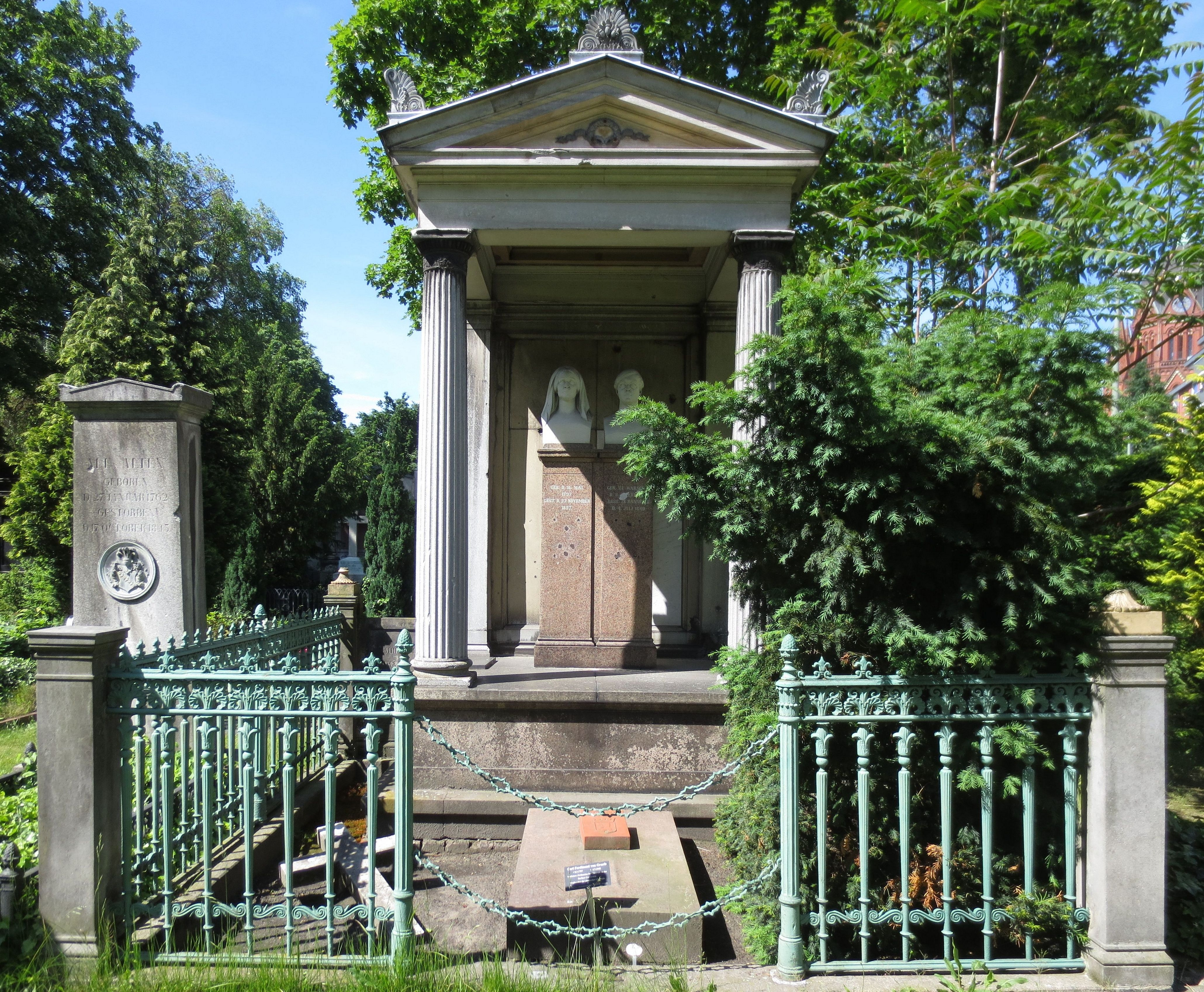
Gravesite of Karl Ferdinand von Gräfe at the Friedhof II der Jerusalems- und Neuen Kirche in Berlin

== Works ==
The following are his principal works:

- Normen für die Ablösung größerer Gliedmaßen (Berlin, 1812) – Standards for the removal of larger limbs.
- Rhinoplastik (1818) – Rhinoplasty.
- Neue Beiträge zur Kunst, Teile des Angesichts organisch zu ersetzen (1821).
- Die epidemisch-kontagiose Augenblennorrhoe Ägyptens in den europäischen Befreiungsheeren (1824) – The epidemic involving ophthalmic blennorrhea in Egypt affecting the European liberation armies.
- Jahresbericht über das Clinische Chirurgisch-Augenärztliche Institut der Universität Berlin (1817-1834) – Annual reports on the clinical-surgical-ophthalmology institute at the University of Berlin.

With Philipp Franz von Walther, he edited the Journal für Chirurgie und Augenheilkunde.
