= Eugène Follin =

French surgeon and ophthalmologist (1823–1867)

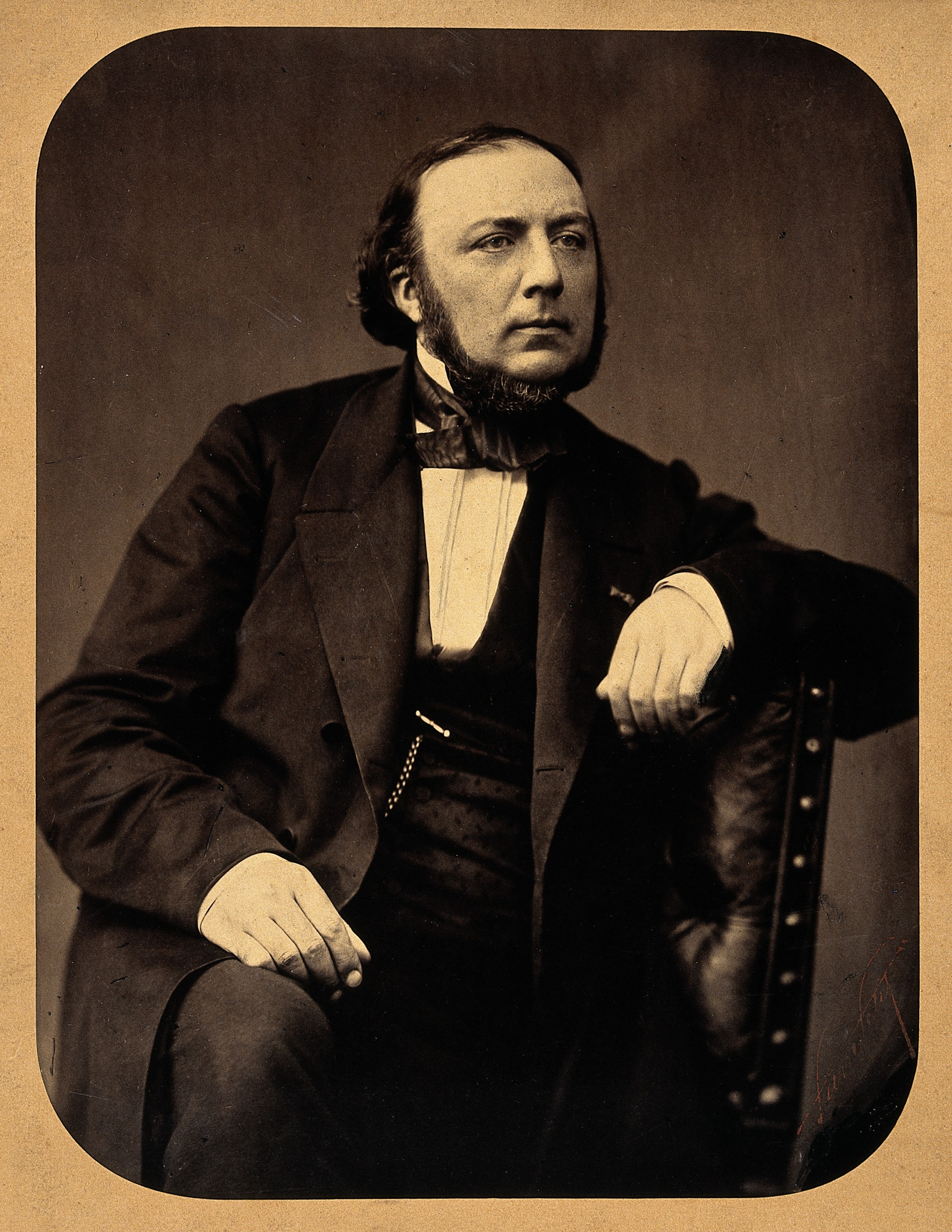
Eugène Follin; photograph by Pierre Petit.

François Anthyme Eugène Follin (25 November 1823 in Harfleur – 21 May 1867) was a French surgeon and ophthalmologist.

He studied medicine in Paris, becoming an interne in 1845, followed by positions as aide of anatomy (1847) and prosector (1850). He obtained his doctorate in 1850 with a thesis titled "Recherches sur les corps de wolf". In 1853 he became an associate professor of surgery.

His earlier writings largely dealt with themes involving anatomy, pathology and general surgery. Around 1853, his focus turned to ophthalmology, of which he was the author numerous articles on glaucoma, iridectomy, accommodation, retinal haemorrhage and treatment of diseases of the lachrymal passages.

He was the author of "Leçons sur l'application de l'ophthalmoscope au diagnostic des maladies de l'oeil" (1859, edited & published by Paul Arthur Doumic), an atlas that is considered to be the first work in the French language dedicated to use of the ophthalmoscope. The "Follin ophthalmoscope" was an early model of ophthalmoscope — it contained four correcting lenses mounted in a revolving disk so that each lens may be rotated in front of the lens aperture of the device.
