= Optometer =

Optometer may refer to:

- Autorefractor, a modern electronic instrument for automatically refracting vision for eyeglasses.
- Optometer (ophthalmic instrument), the earliest name for a phoropter, for refracting vision for eyeglasses.
