= Mem (disambiguation) =

Mem is a Semitic letter.

Mem or MEM may also refer to:

== Business and organizations ==
- Ministry of Emergency Management, the Chinese government ministry
- Missouri Employers Mutual, a workers' compensation insurance company
- Mondpaca Esperantista Movado, an Esperanto association
- The Main Event Mafia, an American professional wrestling stable

== People ==
- Mem (given name), including a list of people with the name or nickname

== Places ==
- Mem Castle, in Sweden
- Memphis International Airport, in U.S., IATA airport code MEM

== Science and technology ==
- 2,5-Dimethoxy-4-ethoxyamphetamine (MEM), a psychedelic drug
- 2-Methoxyethoxymethyl (MEM), an alcohol protecting group
- Mars Excursion Module, a 1960s proposed spacecraft
- Eagle's minimal essential medium, a synthetic cell culture medium
- Monocular estimate method, a form of dynamic retinoscopy
- Mem (command), a DOS command

== Other uses ==
- Master of Engineering Management, an academic degree
- Master of Environmental Management, an academic degree
- Memphis Grizzlies, a National Basketball Association team based in Memphis, Tennessee

== See also ==
- Meme
- Mems (disambiguation)
- Memory (disambiguation)
- Mem and Zin, a Kurdish classic love story
