= Streff =

Streff may refer to:

- Sally Streff Buzbee, American journalist
- Ben Streff, Luxembourgish politician
- Streff syndrome, vision condition
