= Optometer (ophthalmic instrument) =

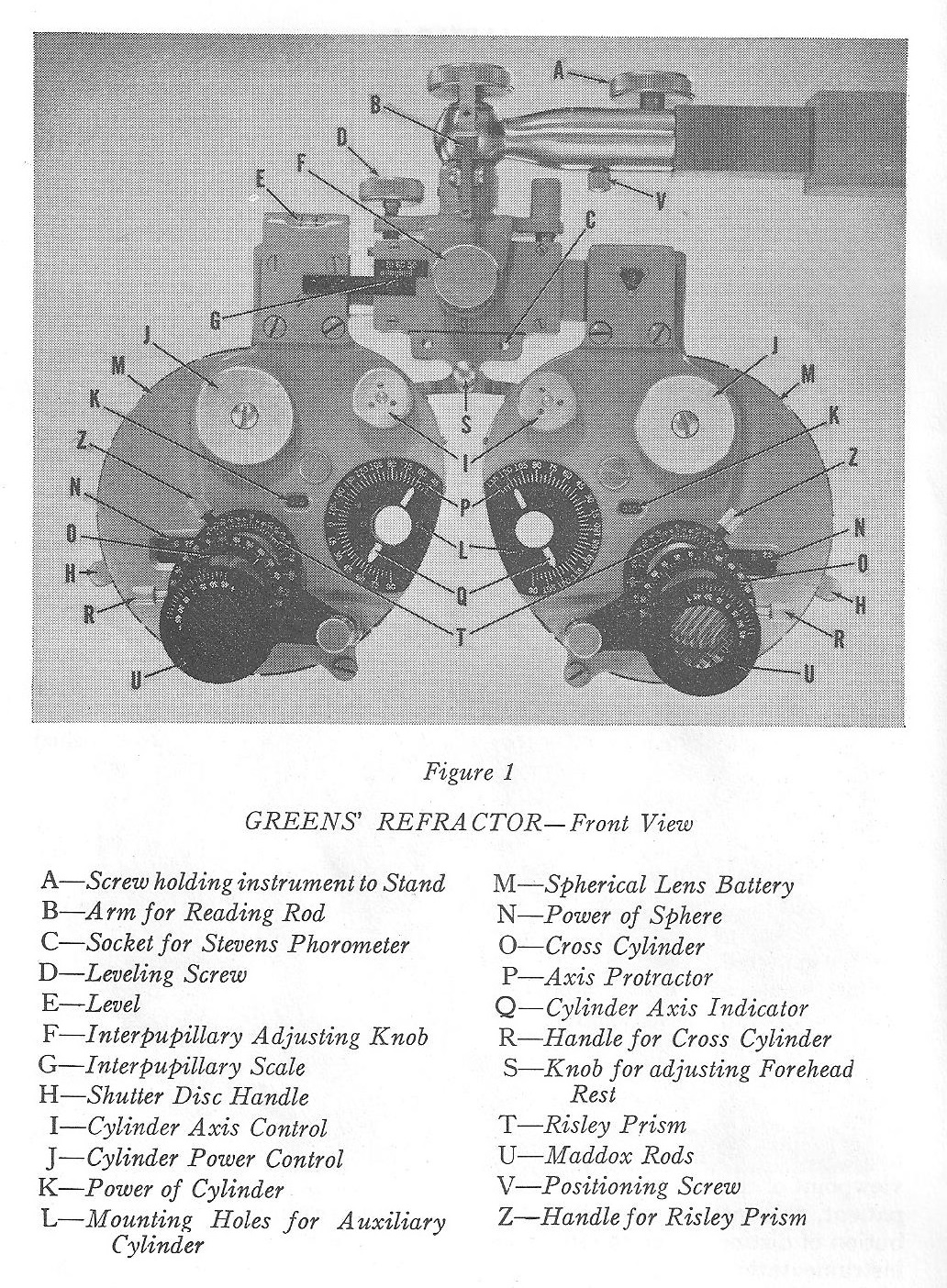
Greens' Refractor, 1934 to 1978

The optometer was a device used for measuring the necessary spherical and/or cylindrical corrections to be prescribed for eyeglasses, from the middle of the 18th century until around 1922, when modern instruments were developed. The term, coined in 1738 by W. Porterfield to describe his Scheiner slit optometer, and used for 200 years to describe many different inventions to measure refractive error of the eye, has completely fallen out of usage today as the task of measuring eyes for spectacles is done with modern instruments, such as the phoropter.

"Phoropter" is one of several generic names for modern instruments containing an optometer for each eye (battery of lenses for determination of optical error), combined with prisms and other attachments for measuring binocularity. The term refractor is another such term, and "vision tester" or other descriptive terms are used because "phoroptor", spelled with "-or", is a trademark of one company.

== The modern phoropter or refractor ==
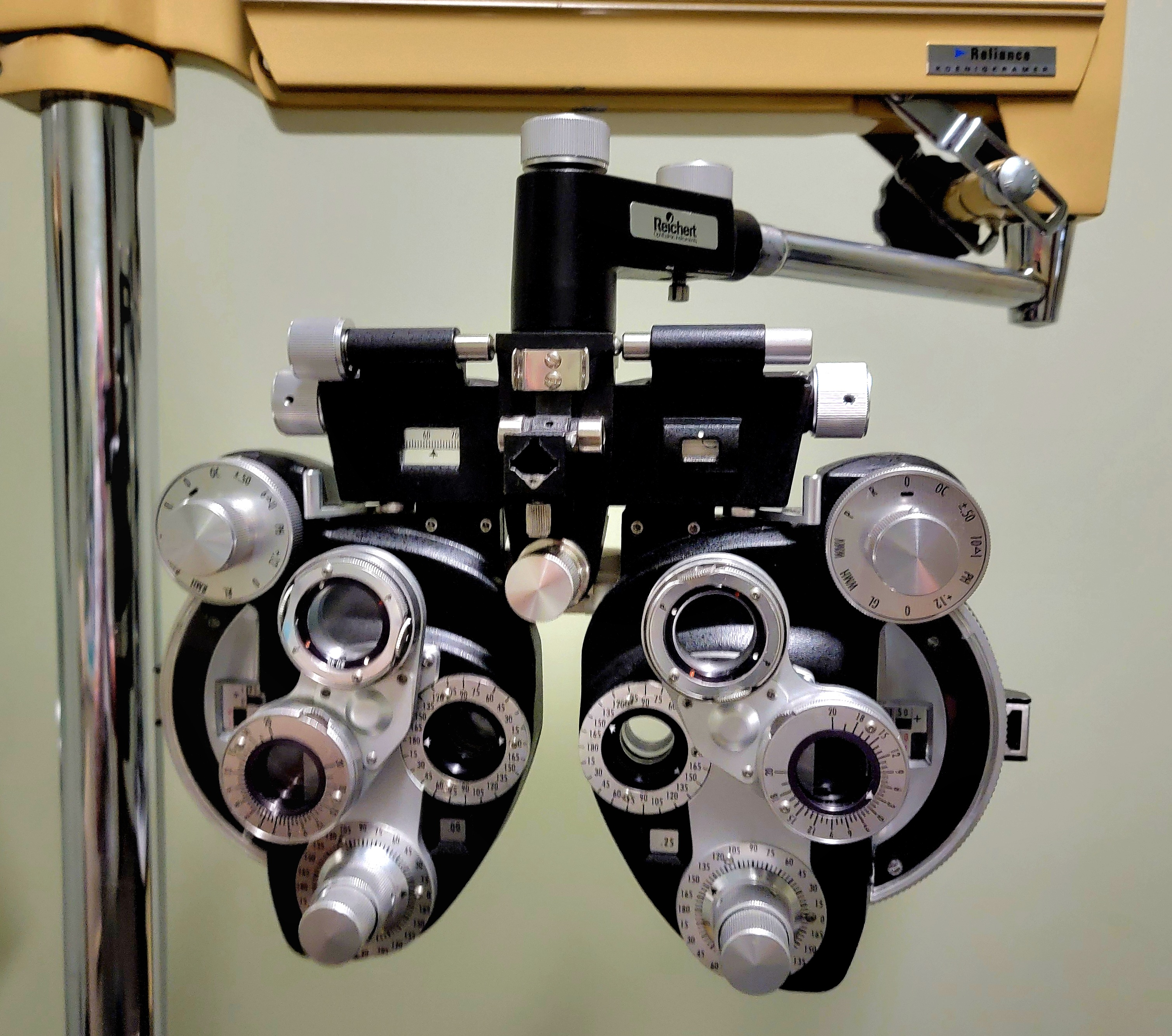
A modern phoropter made by Reichert

In the middle of the 19th century, doctors tested for optical error using single hand-held lenses, held one at a time in front of the patient's eye, or in a trial frame. A wooden case with dozens or hundreds of lenses was held on the doctor's lap, or in a case near the patient's chair, as he or she examined the patient.

In the later part of the 19th century, the United States, Germany, France and the UK were actively inventing numerous mechanical optometers, to speed up the process of bringing lenses before the patients' eyes. Various patented or unpatented optometers were sold throughout the later 19th and the start of the 20th centuries, some containing rotating batteries of lenses in various arrangements, usually with the name of the inventor at the front.

Around 1910, binocularity was tested using trial frames which sat on the patient's face or on a support bar, with extra testing devices added to the front of the frames, such as Maddox rods, rotating prisms, and phorometers. The refraction part of the exam was done with trial lenses that fit into the back of the same trial frame. Optometer was the generic name for devices, crude and simple, with rotating batteries of sphere and cylinder lenses placed in front of each eye, one at a time; so there was no testing for binocularity. When the optometer and phorometer were combined into single instruments, the modern refractor/phoropter was born. This happened in the middle 1910s when two companies in the New York City area began to market competing versions.

A third US company, Bausch & Lomb, joined the competition in 1934, while the other two made improvements. Around that time, many companies in Europe and Asia began making phoropters of their own design, as well as copying American models.

== Examples of optometers ==
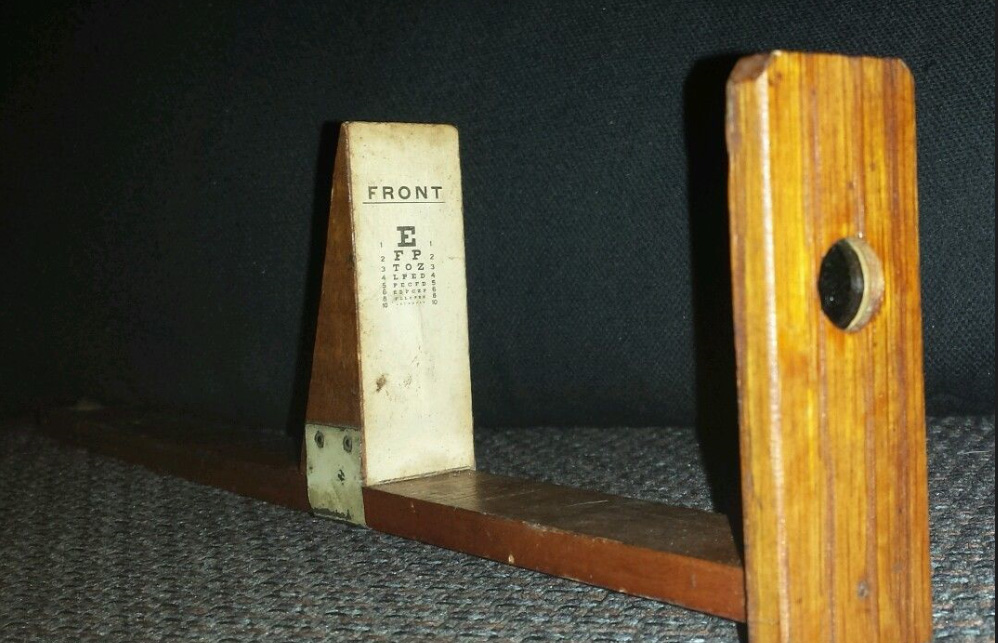
18th century style slide optometer

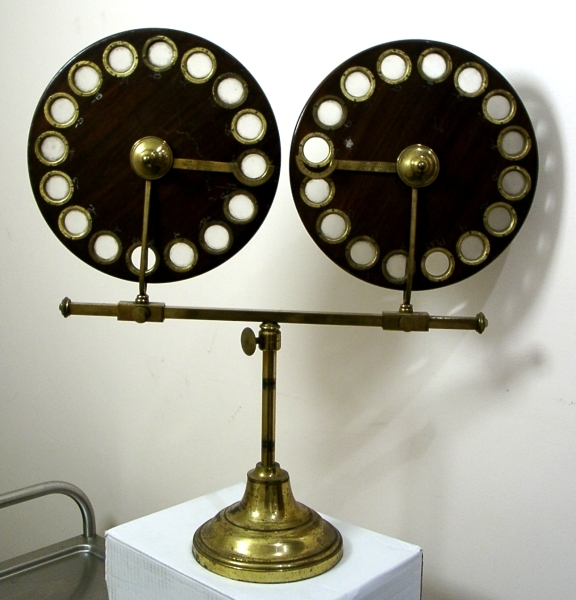
Davidson's Optometer, 1880s, British.

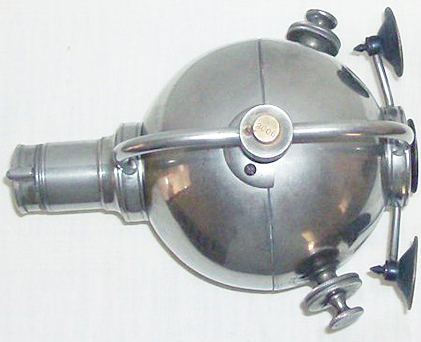
Johnston Optometer, 1882, American

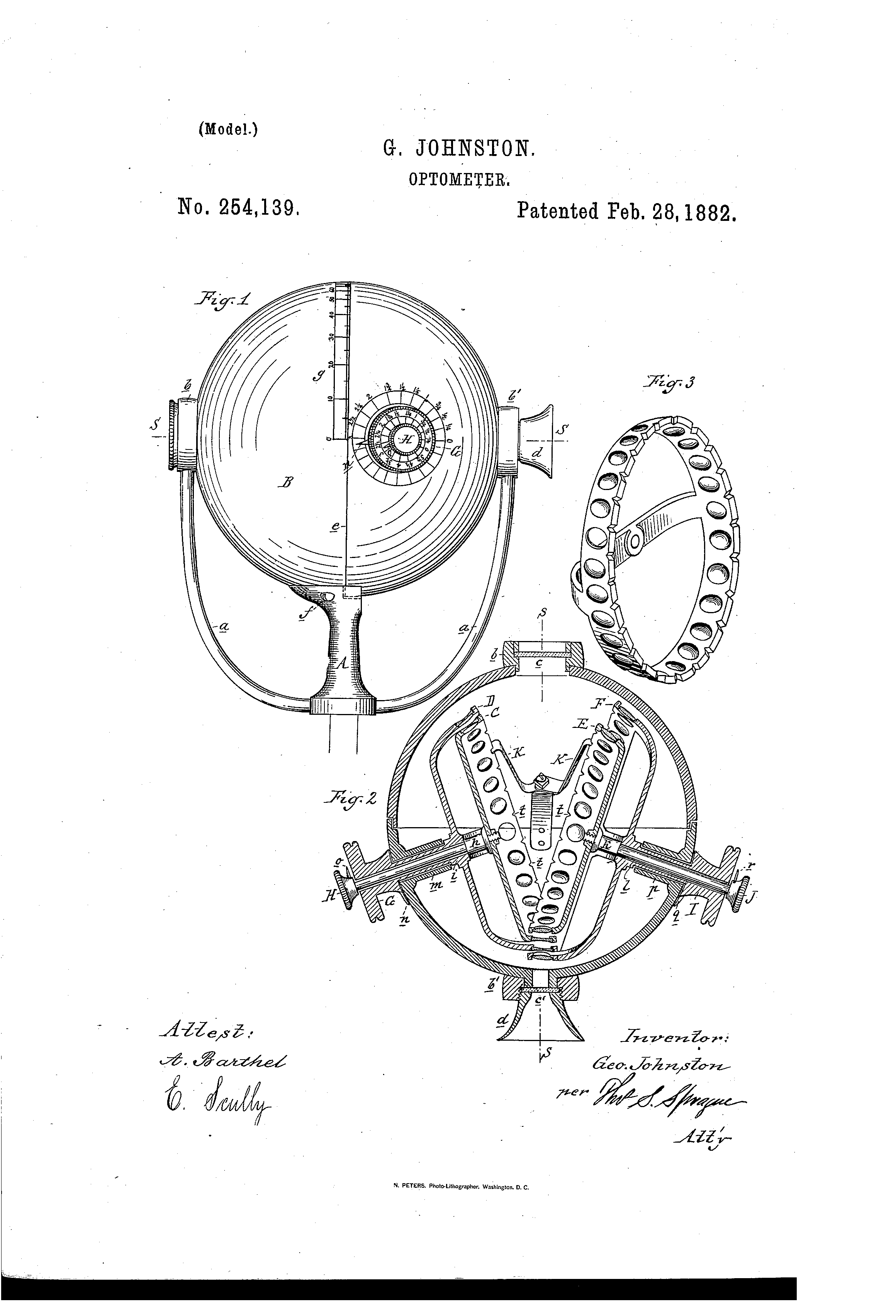
1882 Patent for Johnston Optometer

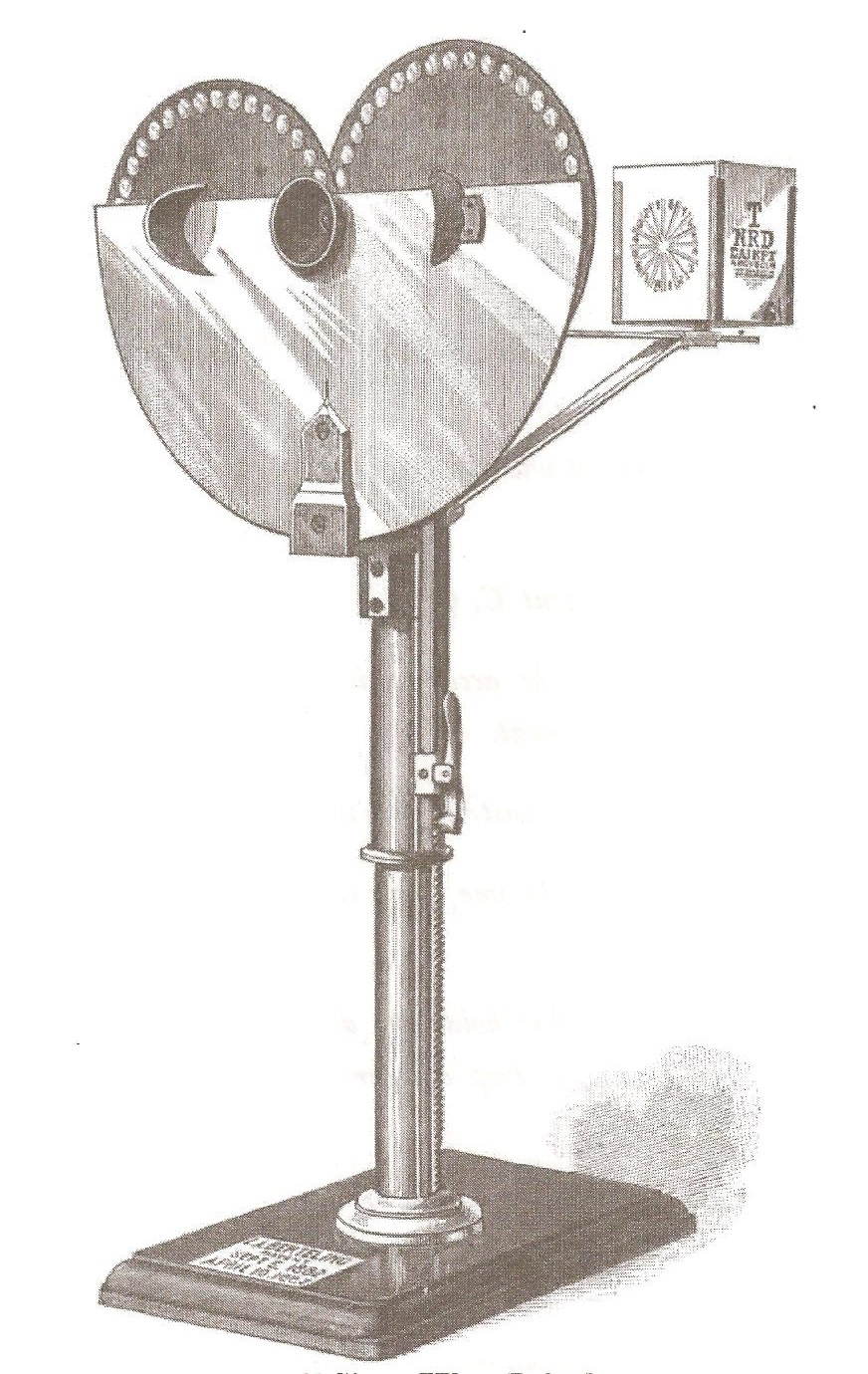
Bertelings Compound Optometer, 1885, American.

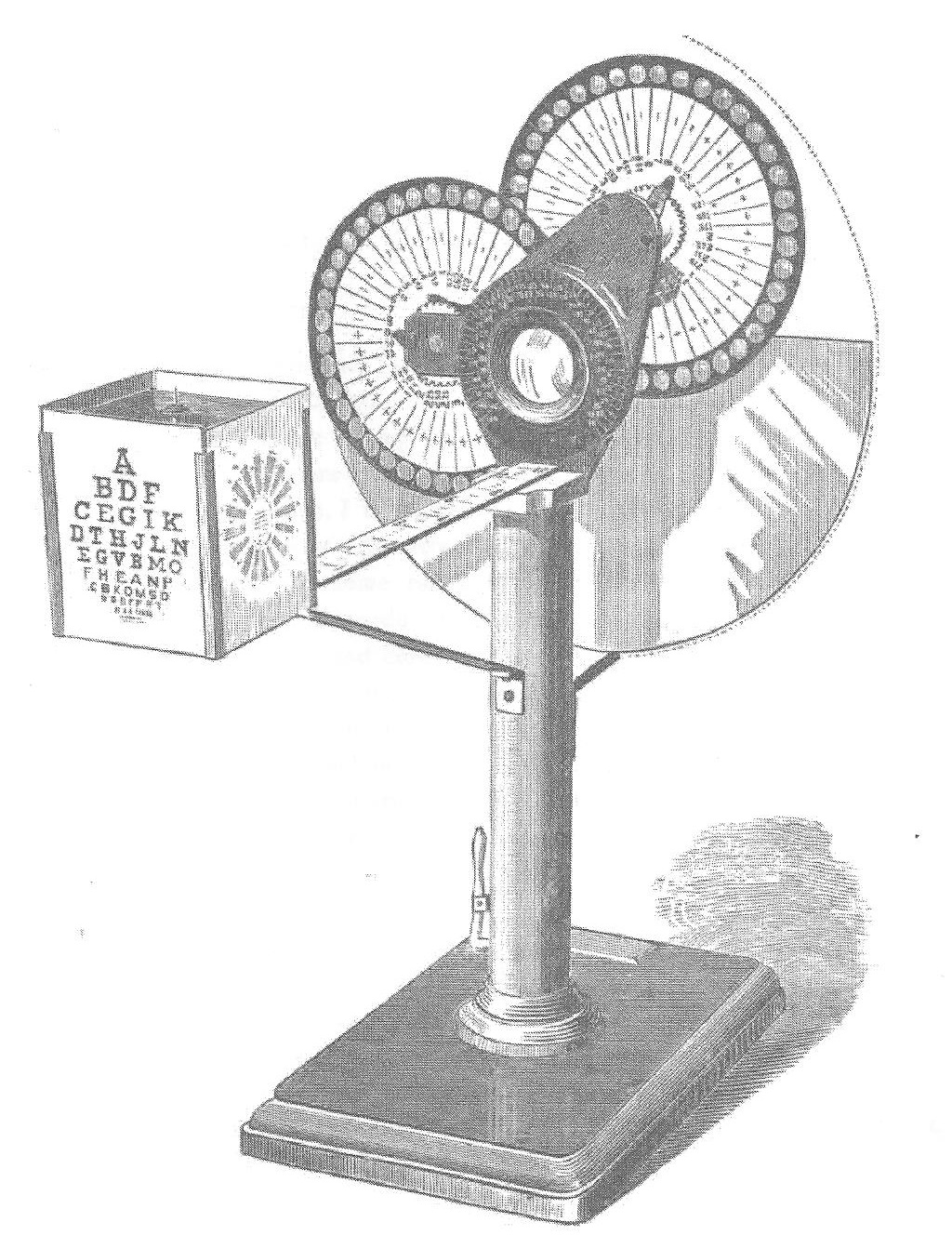
Bertelings Compound Optometer of 1885, front view.

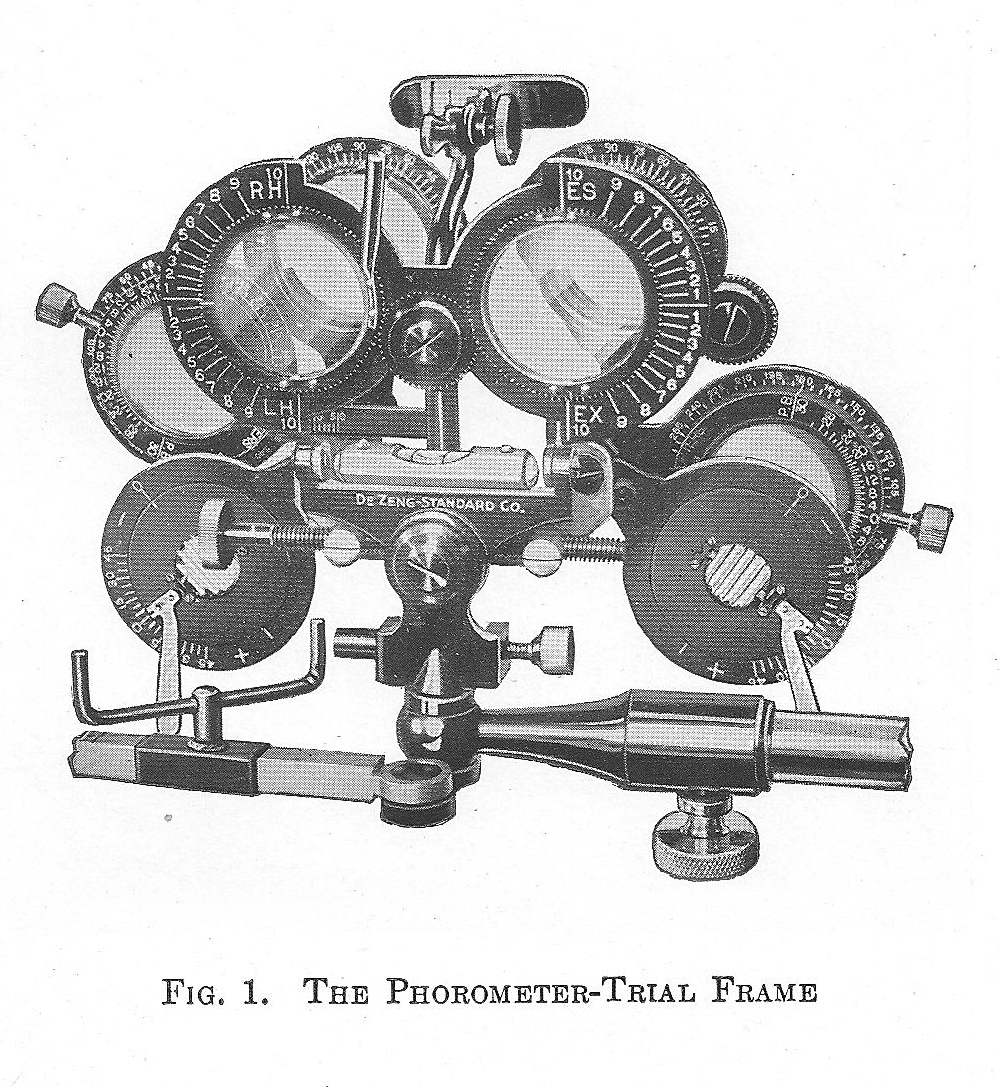
DeZeng's Phorometer Trial Frame of 1909.

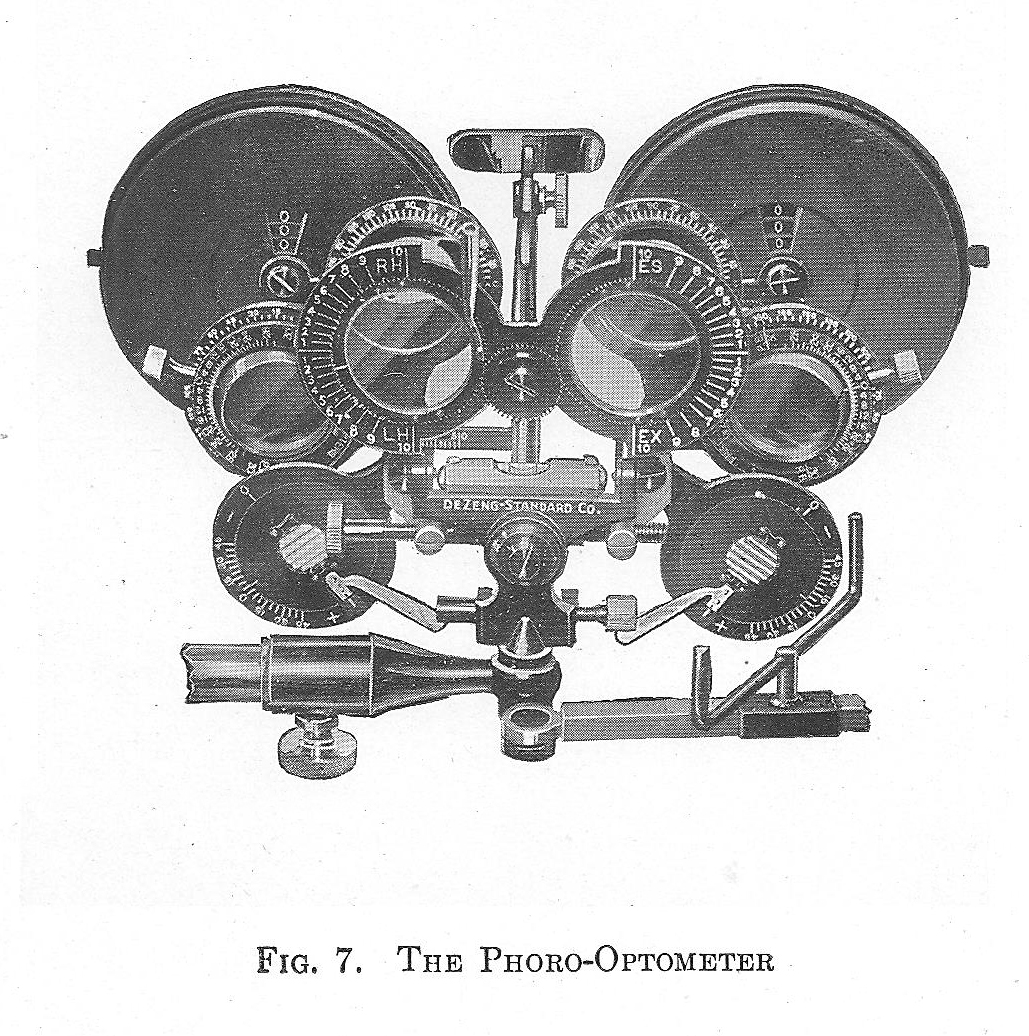
DeZeng's Phoro-Optometer of 1917.

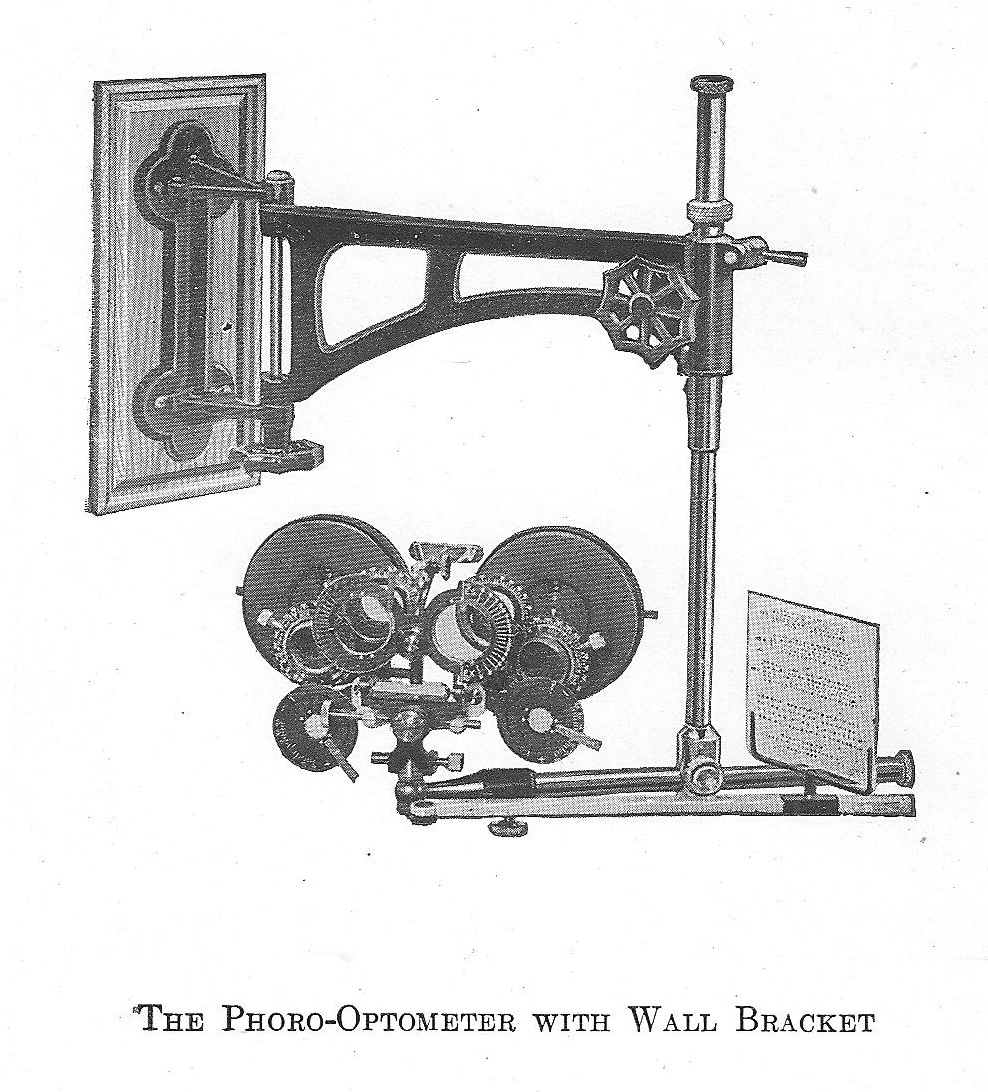
DeZeng's Phoro-Optometer of 1917 with wall mount.

== See also ==
- Phoropter
- Ophthalmic lens
- Ophthalmologist
- Optometrist
- Orthoptist
