= Stigmatism =

Optical term

In geometric optics, stigmatism refers to the image-formation property of an optical system which focuses a single point source in one phase optics space into a single point in image space. Two such points are called a stigmatic pair of the optical system. Many optical systems, even those exhibiting optical aberrations, including astigmatism, have at least one stigmatic pair. Stigmatism is applicable only in the approximation provided by geometric optics. In reality, image formation is, at best diffraction-limited, and point-like images are not possible due to the wave nature of light.
