= Phoropter =

Ophthalmic testing device

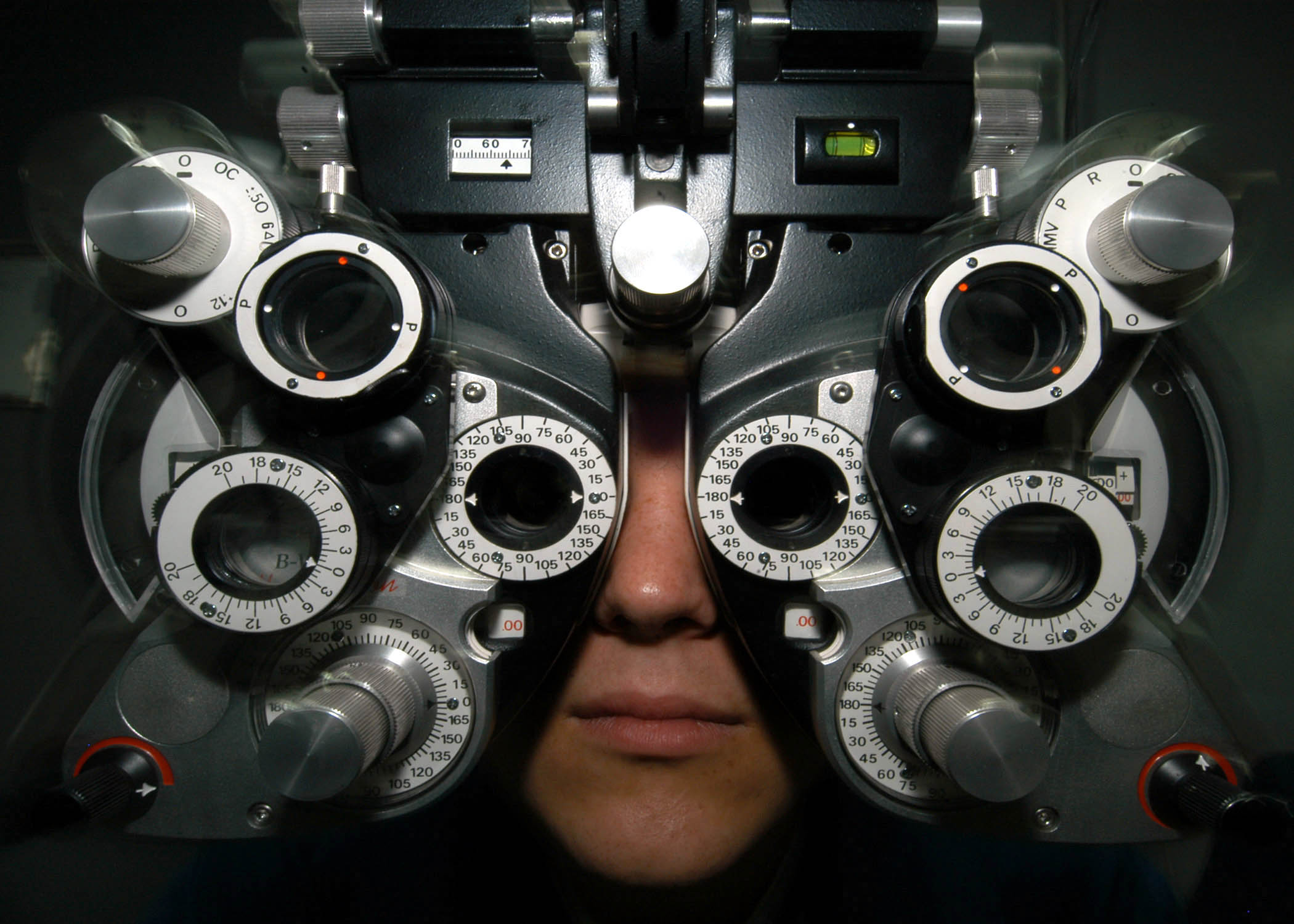
A phoropter can measure refractive error to determine an individual's spectacle lens prescription during an eye examination.

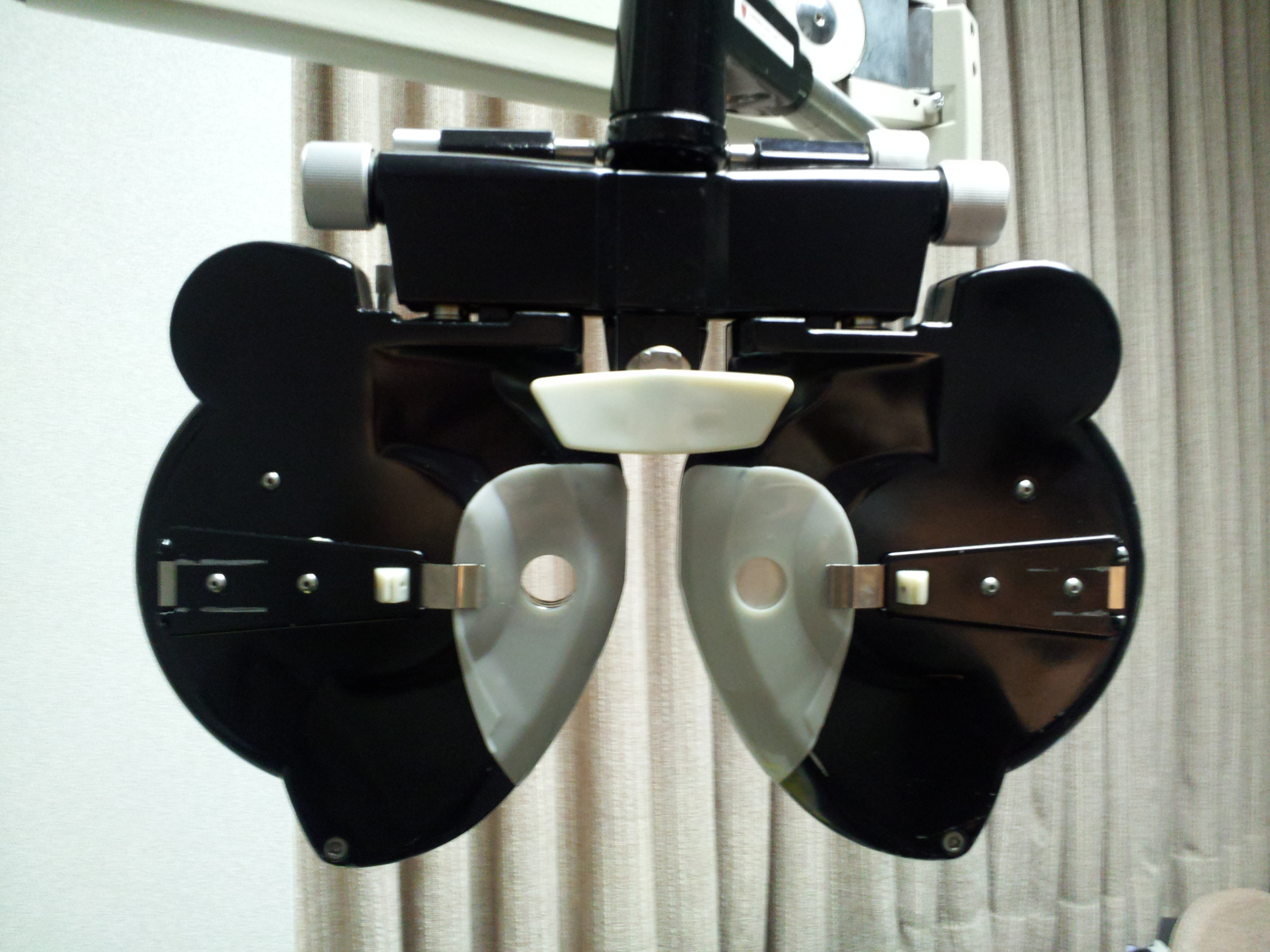
Side of a phoropter that faces the patient

A phoropter or refractor is an ophthalmic testing device. It is commonly used by eye care professionals during an eye examination, and contains different lenses used for refraction of the eye during sight testing, to measure an individual's refractive error and determine their eyeglass prescription. It also is used to measure the patient's phorias and ductions, which are characteristics of binocularity.

== Operation ==
Typically, the patient sits behind the phoropter, and looks through it at an eye chart placed at optical infinity (20 feet (6 m)), then at near (16 inches (41 cm)) for individuals needing reading glasses. The eye care professional then changes lenses and other settings, while asking the patient for subjective feedback on which settings gave the best vision. The patient's habitual prescription or an automated refractor may be used to provide initial settings for the phoropter. Sometimes a retinoscope is used through the phoropter to measure the vision without the patient having to speak, which is useful for infants and people who do not speak the language of the practitioner.

Phoropters can also measure heterophorias (natural resting position of the eyes), accommodative amplitudes, accommodative leads/lags, accommodative posture, horizontal and vertical vergences, and more.

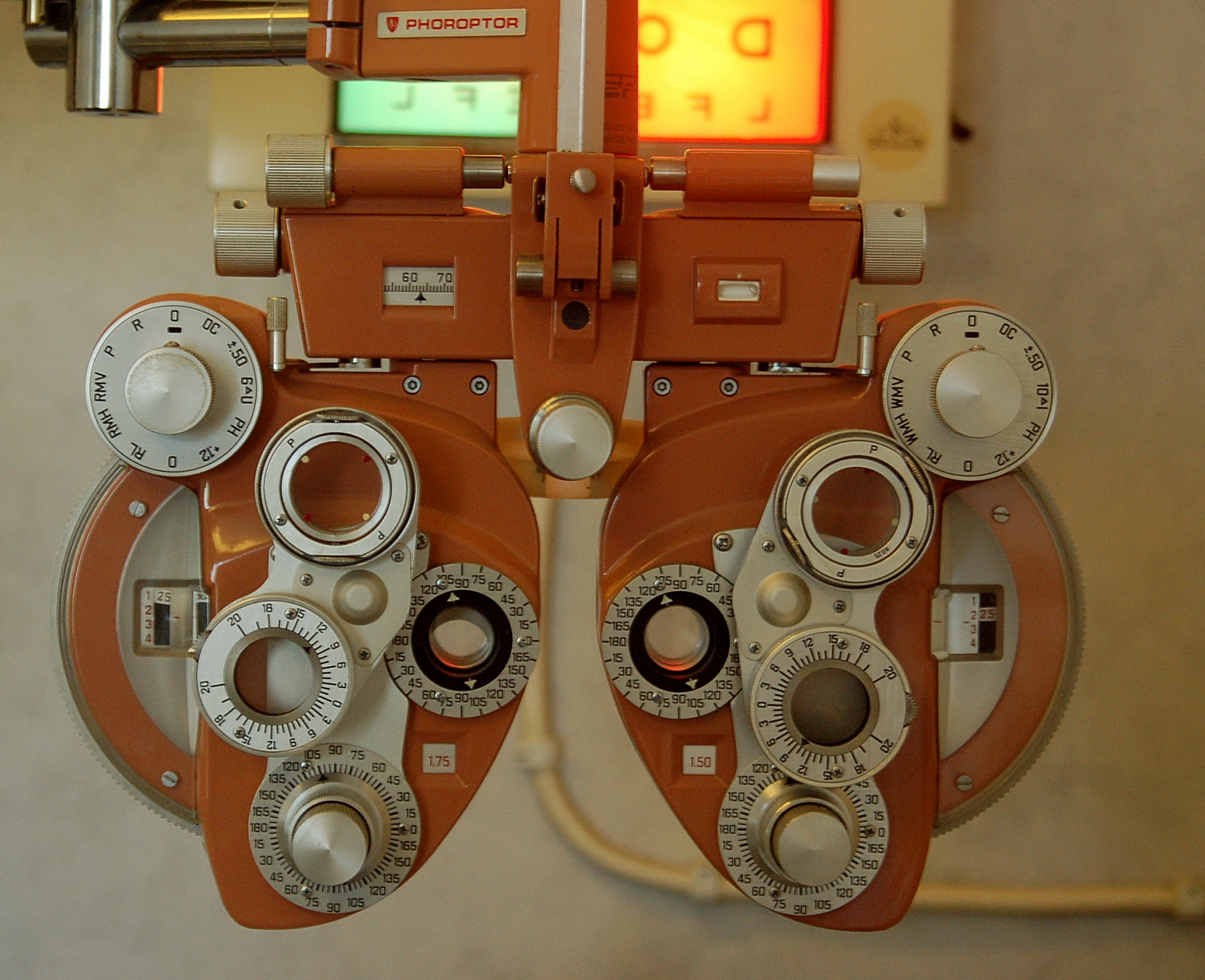
The American Optical Ultramatic RxMaster of 1967

The major components of the phoropter are the battery of spherical and cylindrical lenses, auxiliary devices such as Maddox rods, filtered lenses, prisms, and the JCC (Jackson cross cylinder) used for astigmatism measurement. The prismatic lenses are used to analyze binocular vision and treat orthoptic problems.

From the measurements taken, the specialist will write an eyeglass prescription that contains at least three numerical specifications for each eye: sphere, cylinder, and axis, as well as pupillary distance (distance between eyes), and, rarely, prism for one or both eyes.

The lenses within a phoropter refract light in order to focus images on the patient's retina. The optical power of these lenses is measured in 0.25 diopter increments. By changing these lenses, the examiner is able to determine the spherical power, cylindrical power, and cylindrical axis necessary to correct a person's refractive error. The presence of cylindrical power indicates the presence of astigmatism, which has an axis measured from 0 to 180 degrees away from being aligned horizontally.

Phoropters are made with either plus or minus cylinders. Traditionally, ophthalmologists and orthoptists use plus cylinder phoropters and optometrists use minus cylinder phoropters. One can mathematically convert figures obtained from either type of phoropter to the other.

== Trademark and origin of the term ==
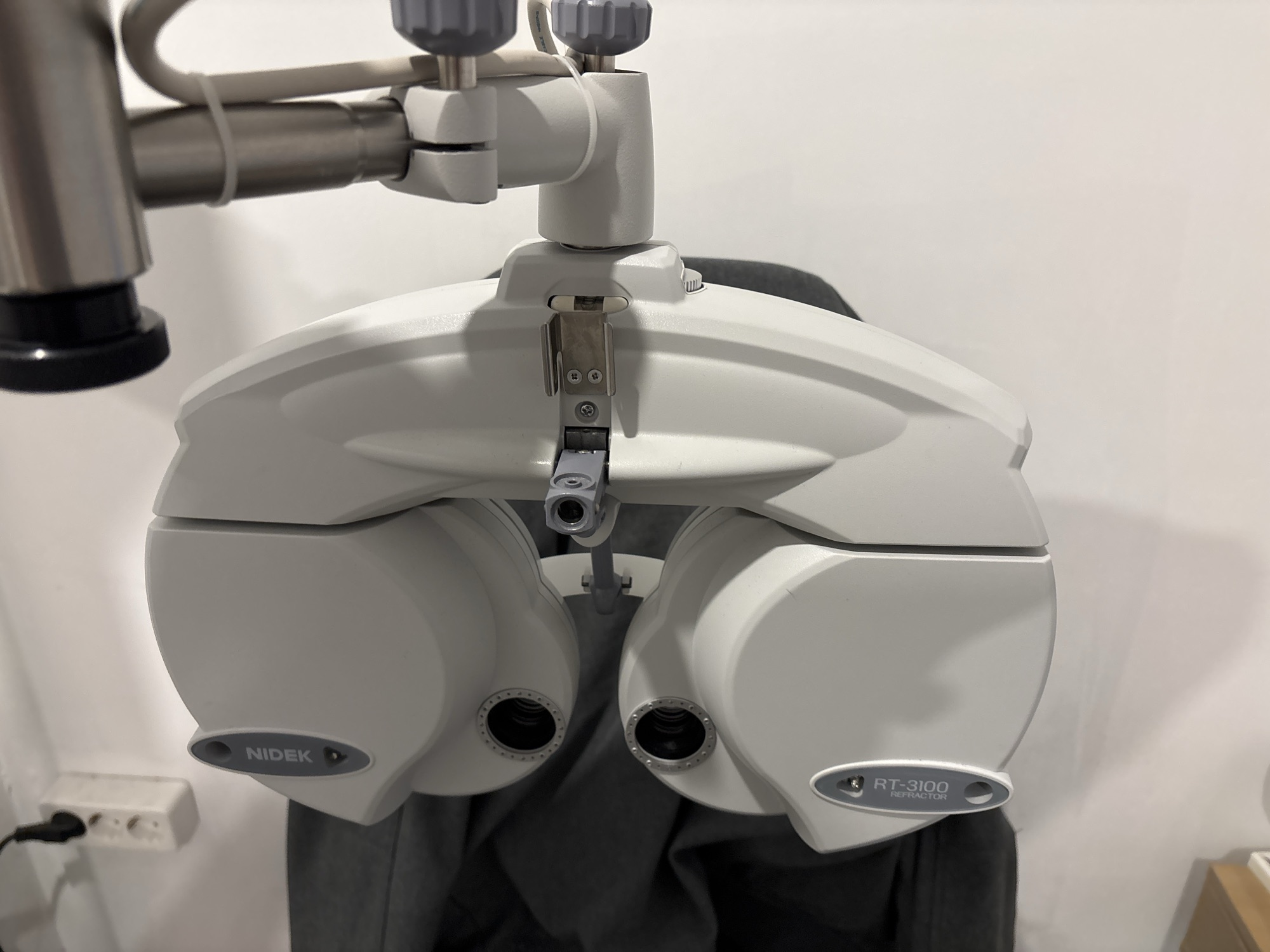
A digital phoropter made by Nidek

Phoroptor is a registered trademark currently owned by Reichert Technologies, filed April 25, 1921, by DeZeng Standard of New Jersey, with the USPTO, serial number 71146698. The word was coined at that time for the newest version of their phoro-optometer. DeZeng was purchased in 1925 by American Optical of Massachusetts, which continued to market the product, but the term, often spelled phoropter, has become a generic trademark for all brands of modern vision testers, especially since AO's main competitor, Bausch and Lomb, stopped making their Greens' Refractor in 1970s. Reichert bought AO's refracting equipment division in 1980s, and their current version is named "Ultramatic Rx Master Phoroptor".

== History ==
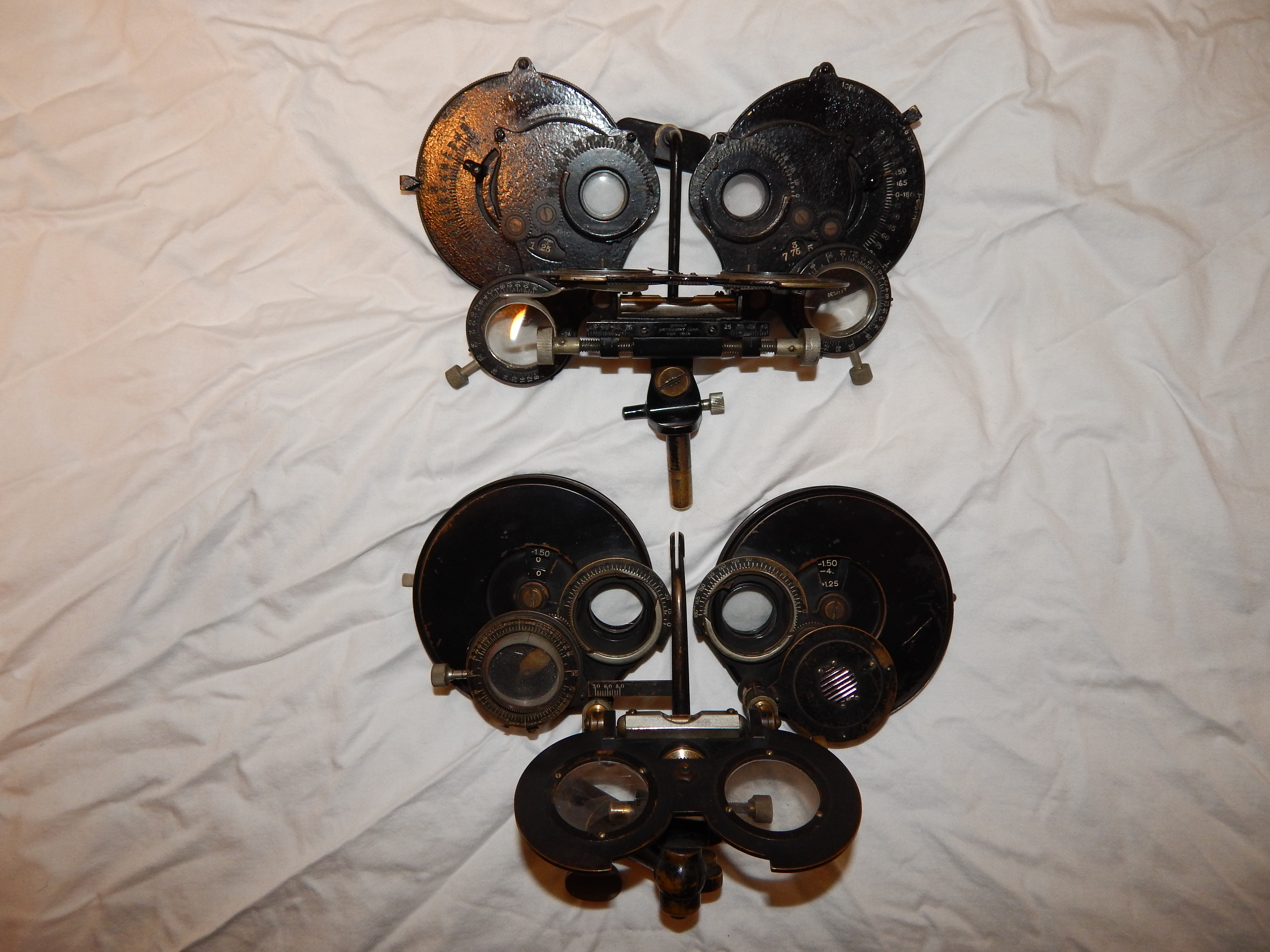
Very early phoropters. Top, the 1917 Woolf Ski-Optometer of New York City, with cylinder.; bottom, the 1915 DeZeng Phoro-Optometer model 570, Camden, NJ. The mounting arms on both devices attached at the bottom.

The history of the phoropter, as a binocular refracting device which can also measure phorias, ductions, and other traits of binocularity, as distinct from the monocular optometer, which cannot, starts in the mid-1910s, with the introduction of the Ski-optometer by Nathan Shigon, and the Phoro-optometer by Henry DeZeng. These two inventions, as they continued to improve, were accompanied by a third device, the Greens' Refractor, which entered the market in 1934. European manufacturers were working on similar devices as well.

=== Shigon/Woolf/Genothalmic/Shuron/BRU ===
In 1909, Nathan Shigon of New York City invented a monocular optometer with a range of +0.25 to +6.00 diopters, consisting of a mechanism where a disc of low-powered lenses advanced a second disc of higher power lenses automatically with each rotation, as in a modern phoropter.

There is no evidence this was ever manufactured, but in 1915 he filed for a patent for a binocular version of this same optometer, and called it the Ski-Optometer, so named for its usefulness in doing skiascopy. This was manufactured by Wm. F. Reimold of Philadelphia. It included a Stevens Phorometer for measuring phorias, and a disc of auxiliary spherical lenses on the back, giving it a range of -12.00 to +12.00 diopters. To extend the range, there were clips on the front of each eye hole for the insertion of hand held sphere or cylinder trial lenses—with a mechanism to rotate the axis with the thumb; it weighed 2 lb. 3 oz.

Around 1916 Michael Woolf, also of New York City, bought him out and added his own invention, an innovative battery of cylinder lenses, ranging from 0.25 to 2.00 D to the device, as well as Risley prisms for each eye. Maddox rods were optional. It was also called the Ski-Optometer, weighing 3 lb. 13 oz.

Around 1924 the patents and rights were transferred to General Optical Company of Mount Vernon, NY, which had been making a much larger, heavier and more solidly encased instrument, called the Genothalmic Refractor, since around 1920, using Woolf's 1917 patent number, and with a user's manual dated 1921. This instrument had a range of +17.75 to - 22.50 sphere, and up to 3.75 cylinder, Maddox rods, Risley prisms, and a Steven's phorometer. It weighed 7 pounds 5 ounces, and unlike all earlier devices of this kind, it hung from a horizontal mounting bar instead of being supported from the bottom. Like the Woolf, it had no Jackson cross-cylinders (JCC) at first, so a separate hand-held one was required. Late models of the Genothalmic were fitted with JCCs.

General Optical sold out to Shuron Optical of Geneva, New York, in 1927, which sold the refractor until the late 1930s. A refined and improved version of the Genothalmic Refractor was manufactured in London starting around 1932, and sold in the UK by S. R. Stearman, S. Pulzer & Son Ltd., and others, as the British Refracting Unit (B.R.U.).

=== DeZeng/American Optical/Reichert ===
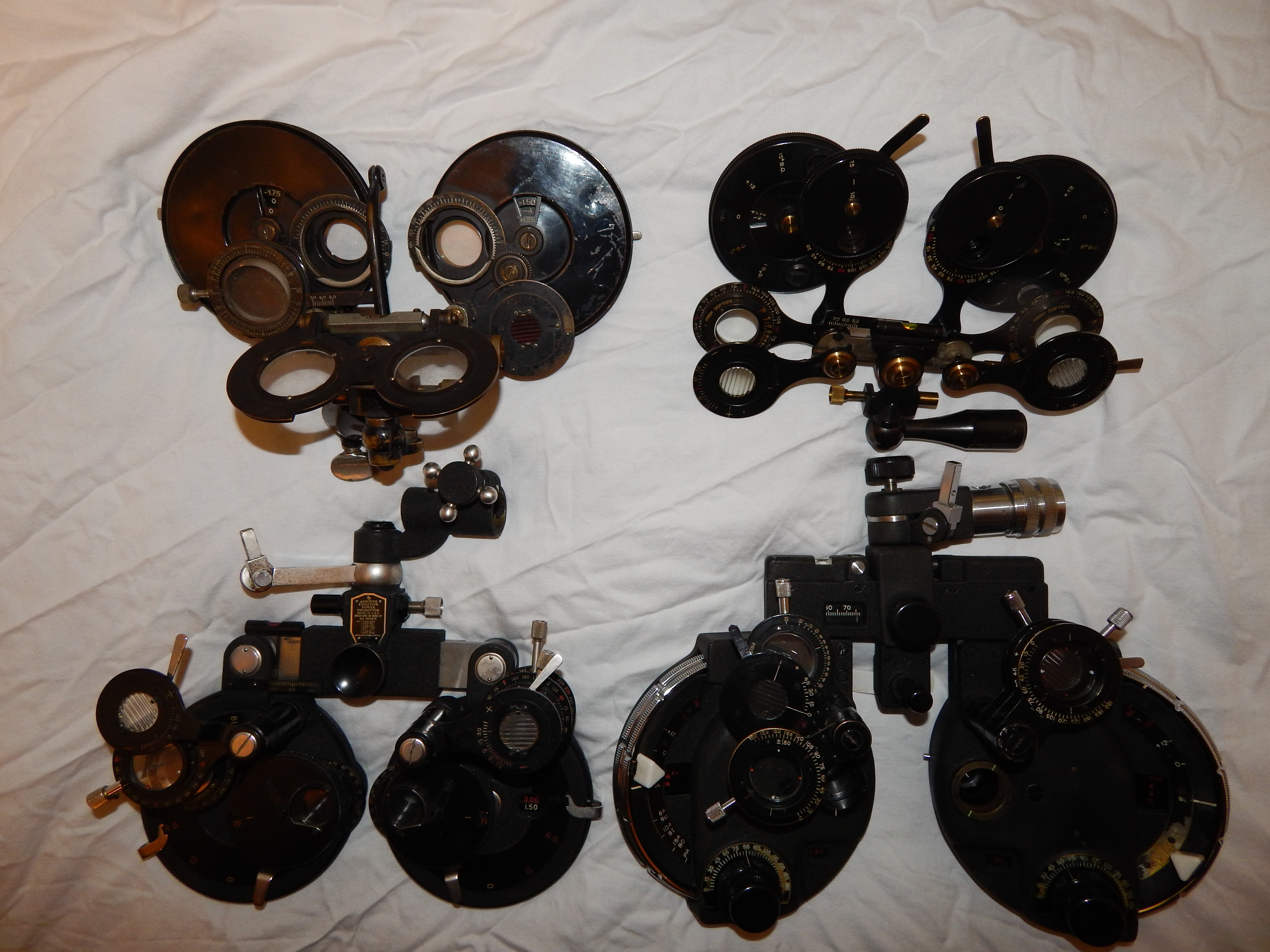
The early DeZeng/AO lineage. Top row: Model No. 570, 1917 or earlier, No. 584, 1922. Bottom row: No. 589, 1934, No. 590, 1948.

Also in 1909, Henry DeZeng got a patent for what looks remarkably like a modern phoropter, but the patent illustrations look nothing like the manufactured product, which was introduced around 1915—the DeZeng Phoro-Optometer model 570. This was a device produced in Camden, New Jersey, which contained a battery of convex lenses for each eye, a battery of concave lenses for each eye, and auxiliary lenses which gave it a total power range of +15.75 to -19.75, as well as a Maddox rod and Risley prism for each eye, and a Steven's phorometer.

There were no cylindrical lenses, so testing for astigmatism required the use of manual trial-lenses, for which there were rotating holders on the front of each eye hole, and there were stationary ones on the backs as well. Cross-cylinders were optional, but they did not flip like a Jackson cross cylinder, they rotated in the same plane, so they were probably meant for the near point cross-cylinder test for reading. It weighed 3 lb. 2 oz. Around 1920 an improved model, No. 574, was introduced, reduced in size but with the same range (lenses reduced from 1 inch to 3/4 inch). The forehead rest was removed, and the rear trial lens clips were replaced with rubber eye guards. It weighed 2 lbs. 12 oz.

In 1922, DeZeng replaced No. 574 with No. 584, and shortened the name to Phoroptor. This device became so popular that its name became genericized, though often spelled phoropter. The Phoroptor was smaller (lenses reduced again, to 9/16 inch diameter), with a similar power range, and the front clips for hand-held trial lenses were removed and replaced with batteries of cylinder lenses ranging from 0.25 D to 4.75 D. The Steven's phorometer was dropped, and there were no Jackson cross cylinders. It weighed 2 lb. 8 oz.

In 1925, American Optical bought DeZeng, and in 1927 introduced No. 588, the AO Wellsworth DeZeng Phoroptor, which was slightly larger; the lenses were increased to 11/16 inch and it weighed 3 lb. 2 oz. This was the first in the DeZeng/AO line to hang from a horizontal mounting bar, the earlier ones were supported from a bar below it. This phoroptor was unique in that it was calibrated in 1/8 diopter steps throughout its whole range.

In 1934, AO introduced No. 589, the Additive Effective Power Phoroptor, once again enlarged and improved. The lenses were increased to 3/4 inch diameter, the permanent size, and the unit was much more massive, with a weight of 7 lb. 9 oz., and with a range of +16.87 to -19.12 sphere and 6.00 cylinder, with auxiliary lenses to increase these to +18.87/-21.12 sphere and 8.00 cylinder. All these models resembled the original DeZeng model in design, but No. 590 of 1948 was a completely re-designed device, much larger and heavier, and more modern. It weighed 10 lbs. 7 oz. This was followed by another complete re-design in 1956, the RxMaster, which became the prototype of all modern phoropters, and was updated to the Ultramatic RxMaster in 1967, which is the current model.

AO sold their phoroptor division to Reichert in 1982, who still make the Ultramatic.

=== Greens'/Bausch and Lomb ===
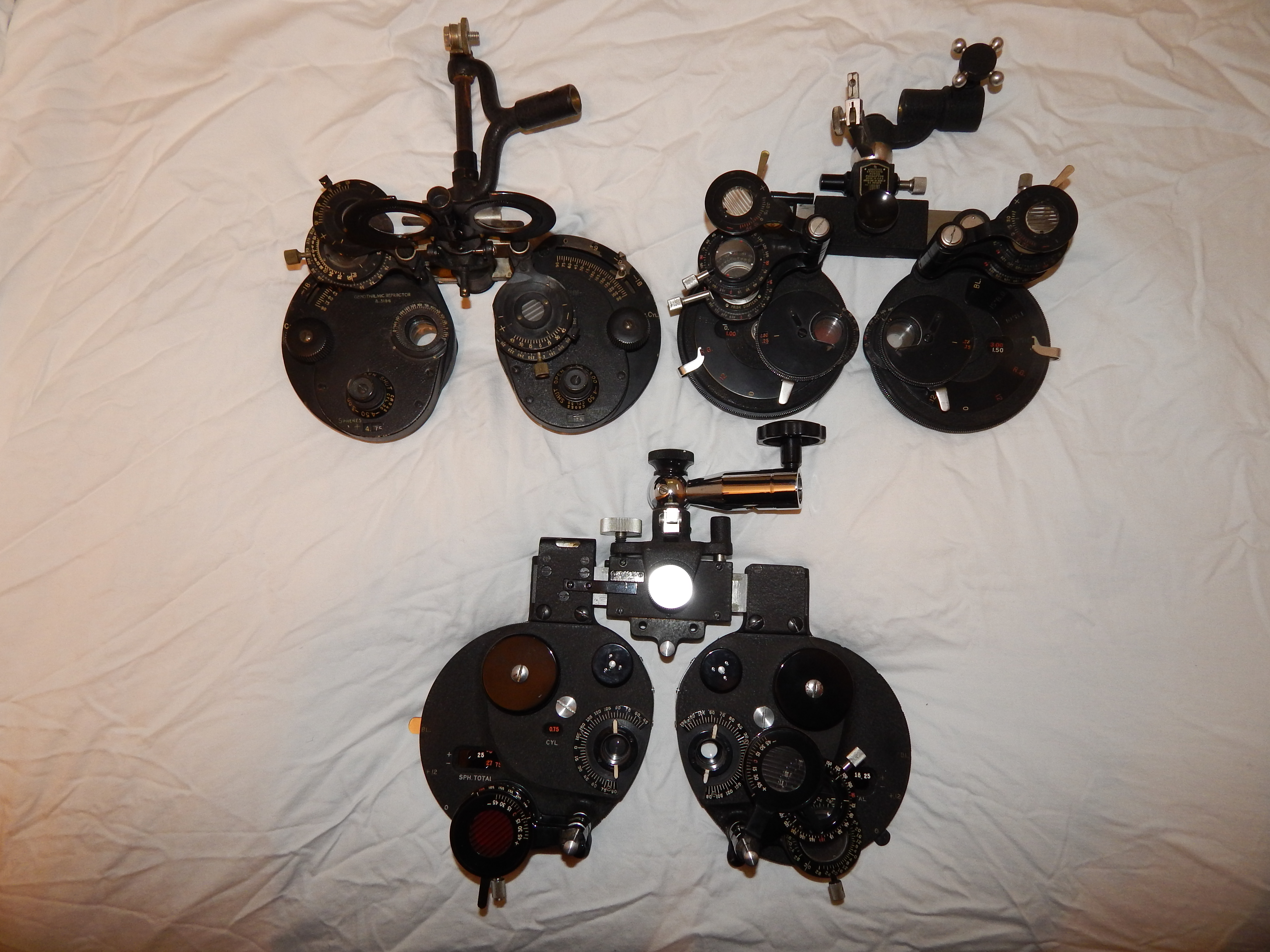
What was available in 1934. Top left, the Genothalmic Refractor; top right, the AO 589 Phoroptor; bottom, the B&L Greens' Refractor, still much in use today.

In the early 20th century, ophthalmologists A. S. Green, L. D. Green, and M. I. Green, of San Francisco, CA, designed an optometer, which they developed slowly over many years. The Greens teamed up with inventor Clyde L. Hunsicker of San Francisco, who applied for a patent on October 25, 1926. The title of their invention was simply an "optometrist instrument", and the text described it as an optometer. Patent 1,804,690 was granted to the Greens and Hunsicker in 1931, and sold to Bausch & Lomb (B&L), which had them redesign it (patent 1,873,356, granted 1932).

B&L trademarked it as "Greens' Refractor" and introduced it in 1934. It was far more advanced than the competition in many ways. The power could be read right off the dial without having to do mental calculations, the range was far higher, from +19.75 to -28.00 and with cylinders up to 7.50, the battery of cylinders was much more intuitive and easy to use, and it was the first to have Jackson cross cylinders affixed, (the first AO Phoroptors with JCC's were late models of the Additive, and very late Genothalmic Refractors also had them). It weighed 13 lbs. 1 oz. The Greens' Refractor soon became the gold standard among eyecare professionals. It helped put the Shigon/Woolf/Genothalmic line out of the market and forced AO to completely redesign their phoroptor from scratch, not once, but twice, (the 590 failed to compete).

The Greens' Refractor remained unchanged for over four decades, but sales slipped when AO introduced the Ultramatic RxMaster with its revolutionary yoked JCC in 1967, and production of the Greens' Refractor finally ended in the mid-1970s. In 1978, B&L introduced the Greens II refractor, also called the Bausch and Lomb Refractor, or the Greens' Mark II Refractor. It included yoked JCC, but AO had already patented the yoking of the JCC, and production of the Greens' II was halted. Very few were made, and they are a rarity. It weighed 11 pounds 13 ounces. As for the original Greens' Refractor, in spite of the fact that production stopped decades ago, many are still being used today, as they are virtually indestructible, and have a devoted rank who still swear by them.

=== Europe and Asia ===
Starting in the mid-20th century, companies in Europe and Asia have made phoropters of their own design, as well as copied American models. The Moeller Wedel Visutest of Germany, the Magnon RT 500 of France, and the Nikon Optester and Takagi MT3, both of Japan, are all of original design. The Topcon VT S of Japan is of original design, but Topcon has also made knock-offs of the Greens' Refractor and the AO Ultramatic. Rodenstock in Germany has developed many of their own models, as well as copied the Ultramatic with their Phorovist 200. The Marco RT-300 of Japan is an original design which borrows heavily from the Ultramatic. In the 1930s, Stearman in the UK and Ellis Optical Co., also in the UK, both made an improved version of the Genothalmic Refractor called the British Refracting Unit, and Stearman also made a knockoff of the Greens Refractor. China makes numerous unbranded knockoffs of the Ultramatic.

== See also ==
- Ophthalmic lens
- Ophthalmologist
- Optometrist
- Orthoptist
