= Mems =

Mems or MEMS may refer to:

- Microelectromechanical systems, the technology of microscopic devices, particularly those with moving parts
- Modular Engine Management System, an electronic control system used on engines in passenger cars built by Rover Group
- Military Emergency Management Specialist, a certification and skill badge awarded by the State Guard Association of the United States

== See also ==
- Mem (disambiguation)
- MEMZ
- MeMZ
