= Streff syndrome =

Streff syndrome is a vision condition primarily exhibited by children under periods of visual or emotional stress.

== Presentation ==
Frequently patients will have reduced stereopsis, large accommodative lag on dynamic retinoscopy, and a reduced visual field (tubular or spiral field). Streff syndrome was first described in 1962 by an optometrist, Dr. John Streff as non-malingering syndrome. In 1962, Dr. Streff and Dr. Richard Apell expanded the concept to add early adaptive syndrome as a precursor to Streff syndrome. Dr. Streff believed the visual changes were induced by stress from reading. There is dispute on the taxonomy of functional vision defects. Some research indicates that Streff syndrome may be caused by a dysfunction in the magnocellular pathway of the retinal ganglion cells. These cells are only 10% of the retinal nerve cells and register motion detection.

== Diagnosis ==
The diagnostic criteria for Streff syndrome are not well established, and the validity of this condition has not been recognized by The American Academy of Ophthalmology, The American Academy of Pediatric Ophthalmology, The American Academy of Optometry or The American academy of Pediatrics.

== Treatment ==
Most optometrists agree that Streff syndrome is a generalized reduction in visual performance that is not caused by structural damage. It is a disease involving vision distress primarily of the accommodation system. Hans Selye described stress, distress and eustress. It is most common in girls ages 8 to 14. Hand held reading material is often positioned excessively close. Reading aloud shows signs of elevated pitch and stumbling over common words. History of homework avoidance and falling class performance are often present. If the patient is directed to read aloud and +.50 lenses are then used, there is usually a dramatic improvement as observed by patient and parent. Abnormal results on color vision or visual field testing is not uncommon. Visual field often presents as constricted 'tubular' at multiple test distances. The poor visual performance is understood as distress, and treatments are usually to provide the patient with low powered reading glasses. The "relaxing" nature of reading glasses is believed to reduce the near vision stress and allow normal function. The emotional effects of chronic near vision stress are also reduced.

The "non-malingering" name is a refutation that the patient is malingering.
