= Monocular estimate method =

- Purpose: measure accommodation response

The monocular estimate method or monocular estimation method is a form of dynamic retinoscopy widely used to objectively measure accommodative response. Values normally attained when performing MEM are between +0.25 and +0.50 diopters.
