= Duction =

Eye movement involving only one eye

A duction is an eye movement involving only one eye. There are generally six possible movements depending upon the eye's axis of rotation:

1. Abduction refers to the outward movement of an eye.
2. Adduction refers to the inward movement of an eye
3. Supraduction / sursumduction / elevation
4. Infraduction / deorsumduction / depression
5. Incycloduction / intorsion
6. Excycloduction / extorsion

== Forced duction test ==
The forced duction test is performed in order to determine whether the absence of movement of the eye is due to a neurological disorder or a mechanical restriction.

The anesthetized conjunctiva is grasped with forceps and an attempt is made to move the eyeball in the direction where the movement is restricted. If a mechanical restriction is present, it will not be possible to induce a passive movement of the eyeball.

== See also ==
- Extraocular muscles
- Eye examination
- Vergence
- Version (eye)
