= Autorefractor =

Type of optical machine

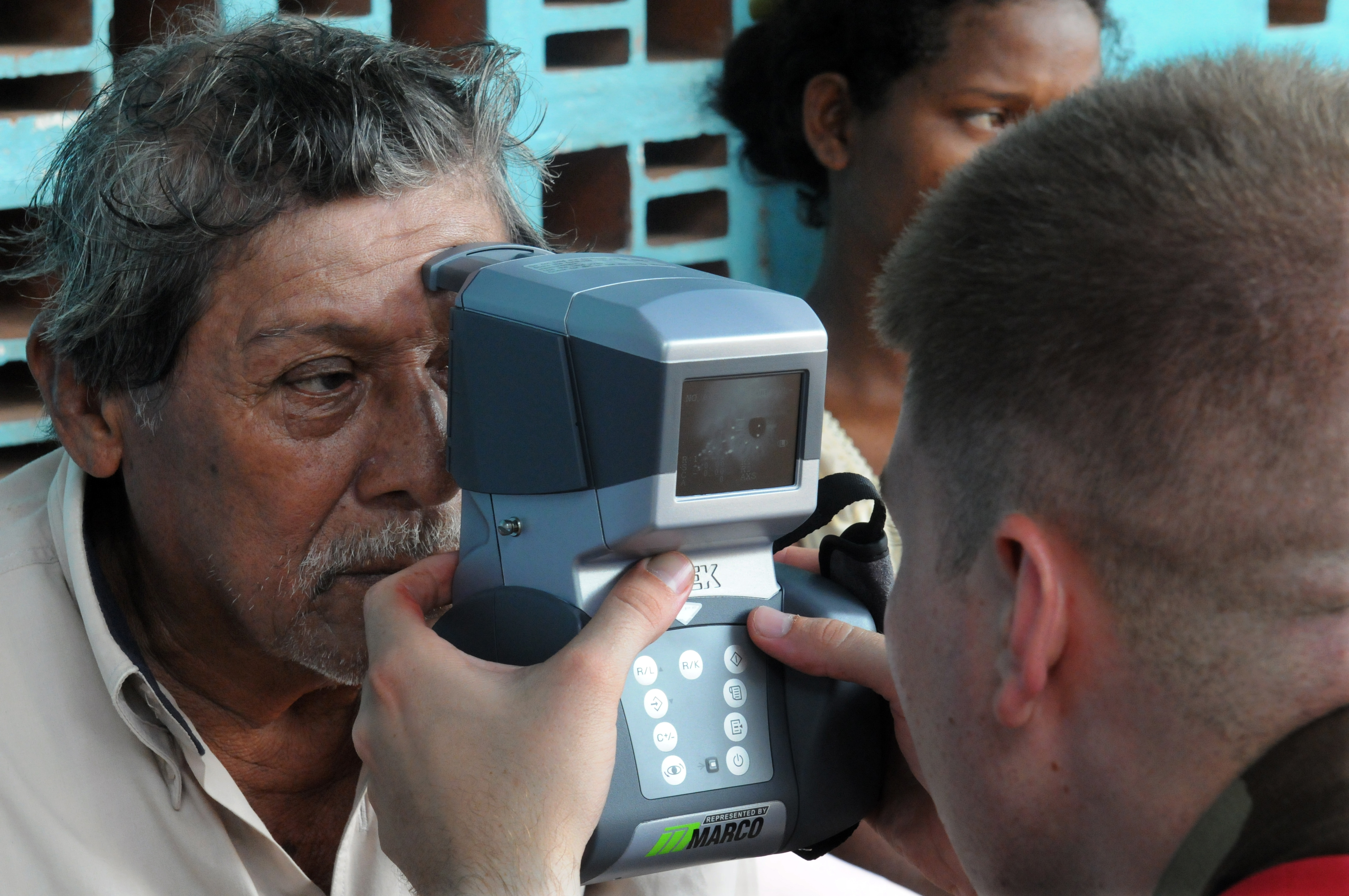
A United States Navy optometrist technician using an autorefractor during a humanitarian assistance project in Nicaragua in 2008

An autorefractor or automated refractor is a computer-controlled machine used during an eye examination to provide an objective measurement of a person's refractive error and prescription for glasses or contact lenses. This is achieved by measuring how light is changed as it enters a person's eye.

== Technique ==
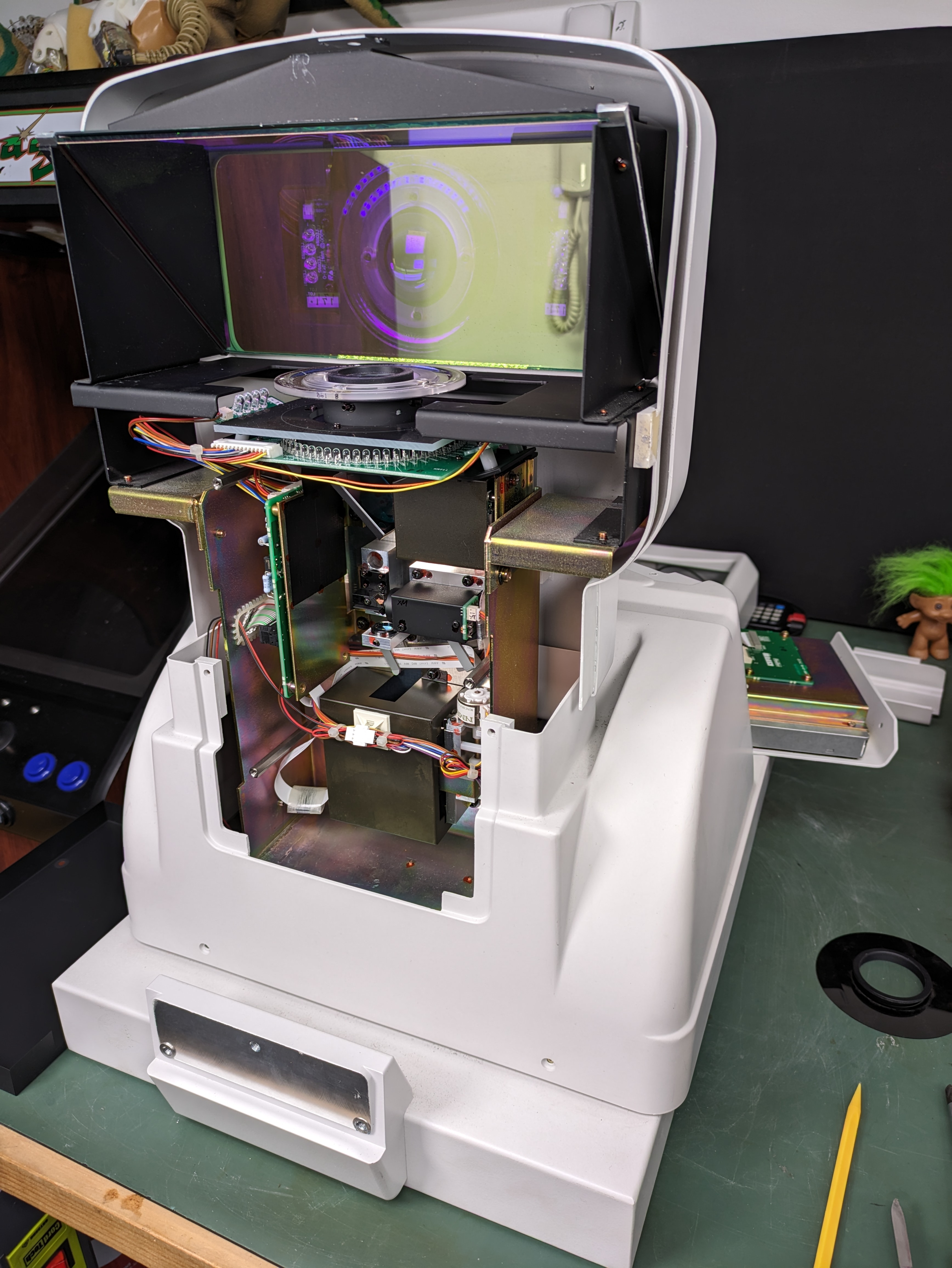
Shin Nippon Nvision K-5001 Refkeratometer

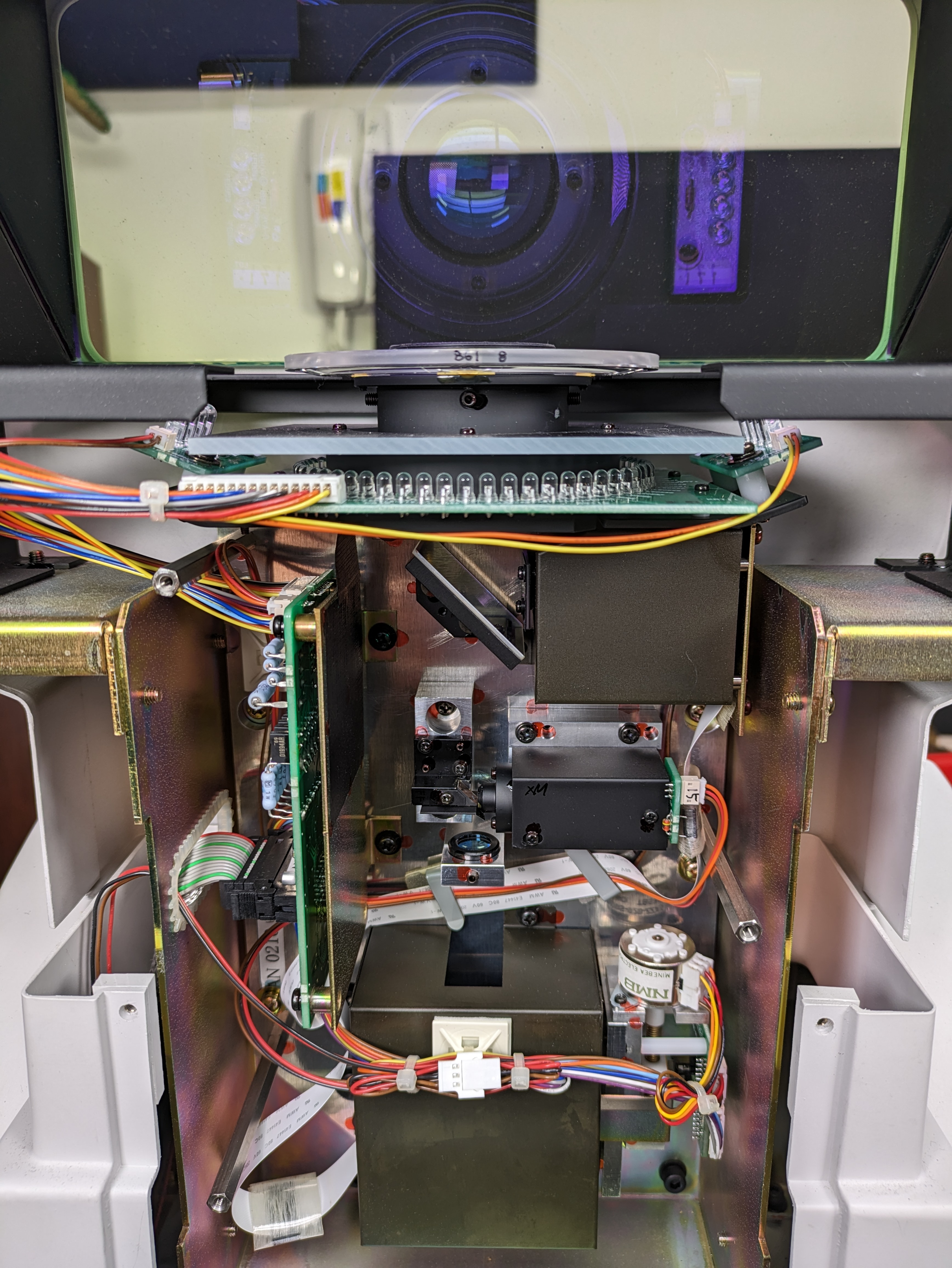
The optics inside a Shin Nippon Nvision K-5001 Refkeratometer

The majority of autorefractors calculate the vision correction a patient needs (refraction) by using sensors that detect the reflections from a cone of infrared light. These reflections are used to determine the size and shape of a ring in the retina which is located in the posterior part of the eye. By measuring this zone, the autorefractor can determine when a patient's eye properly focuses an image. The instrument changes its magnification until the image comes into focus. The process is repeated in at least three meridians of the eye and the autorefractor calculates the refraction of the eye, sphere, cylinder and axis. Modern autorefractors are based on the idea patented by Tom Cornsweet.

== Uses ==
In some offices, this process is used to provide the starting point for the ophthalmologist or optometrist in subjective refraction tests. Here, lenses are switched in and out of a phoropter and the patient is asked "which looks better" while looking at a chart. This feedback refines the prescription to one which provides the patient with the best vision.

Automated refraction is particularly useful when dealing with non-communicative people such as young children or those with disabilities.

== Retinoscopy ==
Retinoscopy performed by an experienced clinician has been found to provide a more accurate estimation of refractive error than autorefraction. Recent studies report that autorefractor measurements without application of cycloplegia medication can result in significant overestimation of myopia.
