= Refractive error =

Problem with focusing light accurately on the retina due to the shape of the eye

- Other names: Refraction error
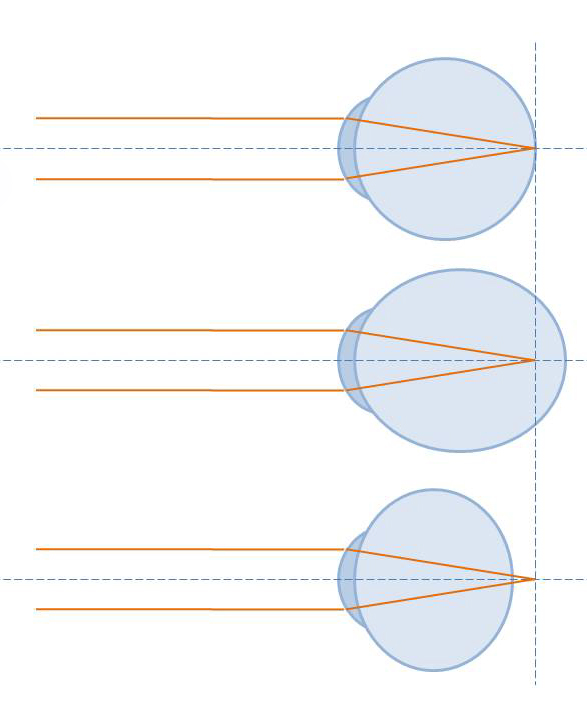
- A correctly-focused eye (top), and two showing refractive error: In the middle image, the light is focused too far forward; in the bottom image, the focal point is behind the eye.
- Specialty: Ophthalmology, optometry
- Symptoms: Blurry vision, double vision, headaches, eye strain
- Complications: Blindness, amblyopia
- Types: Near-sightedness, far-sightedness, astigmatism, presbyopia
- Causes: Eyeball length, problems with cornea shape, aging of the lens
- Diagnostic method: Eye examination
- Treatment: Eyeglasses, contact lenses, refractive surgery
- Frequency: ~1.5 billion

Refractive error is a problem with focusing light accurately on the retina due to the shape of the eye and/or cornea. The most common types of refractive error are near-sightedness, far-sightedness, astigmatism, and presbyopia. Near-sightedness results in far away objects being blurry, far-sightedness and presbyopia result in close objects being blurry, and astigmatism causes objects to appear stretched out or blurry. Other symptoms may include double vision, headaches, and eye strain.

Near-sightedness is due to the length of the eyeball being too long; far-sightedness the eyeball too short; astigmatism the cornea being the wrong shape, while presbyopia results from aging of the lens of the eye such that it cannot change shape sufficiently. Some refractive errors occur more often among those whose parents are affected. Diagnosis is by eye examination.

Refractive errors are corrected with eyeglasses, contact lenses, or surgery. Eyeglasses are the easiest and safest method of correction. Contact lenses can provide a wider field of vision; however they are associated with a risk of infection. Refractive surgery may consist of either permanently changing the shape of the cornea or, alternatively, implanting intraocular lenses.

The number of people globally with refractive errors has been estimated at one to two billion. Rates vary between regions of the world with about 25% of Europeans and 80% of Asians affected. Near-sightedness is the most common disorder. Rates among adults are between 15 and 49% while rates among children are between 1.2 and 42%. Far-sightedness more commonly affects young children and the elderly. Presbyopia affects most people over the age of 35.

The number of people with refractive errors that have not been corrected was estimated at 660 million (10 per 100 people) in 2013. Of these 9.5 million were blind due to the refractive error. It is one of the most common causes of vision loss along with cataracts, macular degeneration, and vitamin A deficiency.

== Classification ==
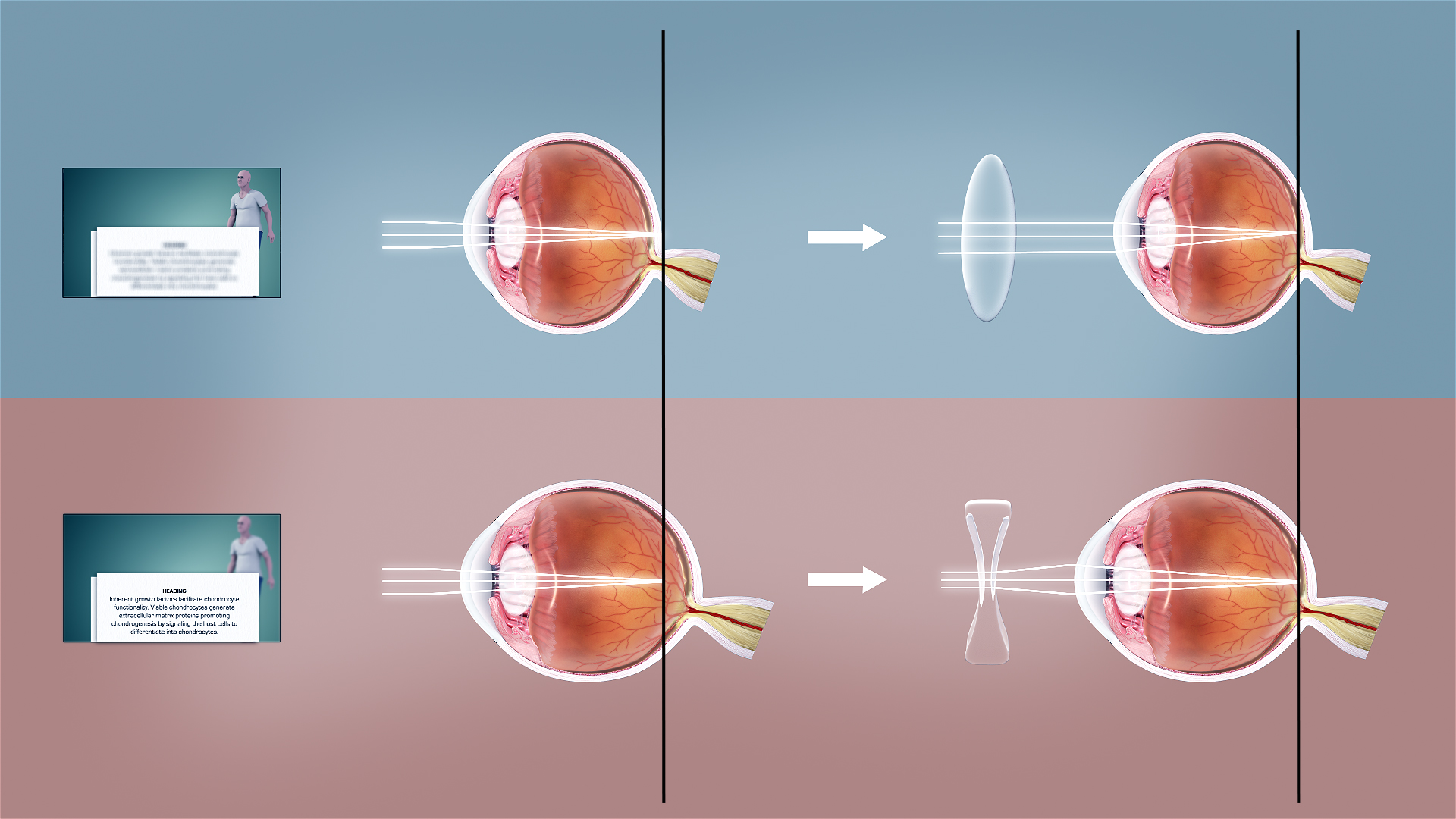
Top: farsighted corrected using convex lens. Bottom: nearsighted corrected using concave lens.

Refractive error – sometimes called "ametropia" – refers to a condition in which the refractive power of an eye does not match the length of the eye, so the image is focused away from the central retina, instead of directly on it.

Types of refractive error include myopia, hyperopia, presbyopia, and astigmatism.

- Myopia or nearsightedness: When the refractive power is too strong for the length of the eyeball, this is called myopia or nearsightedness. People with myopia typically have blurry vision when viewing distant objects because the eye is refracting more than necessary. Myopia can be corrected with a concave lens, which causes the divergence of light rays before they reach the cornea.
- Hyperopia or farsightedness: When the refractive power is too weak for the length of the eyeball, one has hyperopia or farsightedness. People with hyperopia have blurry vision when viewing near objects because the eye is unable to focus the light sufficiently. This can be corrected with convex lenses, which cause light rays to converge prior to hitting the cornea.
- Presbyopia: When the elasticity of the lens declines, typically due to age, the individual experiences difficulty in near vision, often relieved by reading glasses, bifocal, or progressive lenses.
- Astigmatism occurs when the refractive power of the eye is not uniform across the surface of the cornea because of asymmetry. In other words, the eye focuses light more strongly in one direction than another, leading to distortion of the image.

Children are typically born hyperopic and shift toward emmetropia or myopia as their eyes lengthen through childhood.

Other terminology include anisometropia, when the two eyes have unequal refractive power, and aniseikonia, when the magnification power between the eyes differ.

Refractive errors are typically measured using three numbers: sphere, cylinder, and axis.

- Sphere: This number denotes the strength of the lens needed to correct your vision. A "–" indicates nearsightedness while a "+" indicates farsightedness. Higher numbers indicate more power in either direction.
- Cylinder: This number denotes the amount of astigmatism, if any.
- Axis: This number notes the direction of the astigmatism and is written in degrees between 1 and 180.

An eye that has no refractive error when viewing distant objects is said to have emmetropia or be emmetropic meaning the eye is in a state in which it can focus parallel rays of light (light from distant objects) on the retina, without using any accommodation. A distant object, in this case, is defined as an object located beyond 6 meters, or 20 feet, from the eye, since the light from those objects arrives as essentially parallel rays when considering the limitations of human perception.

== Risk factors ==
=== Genetics ===
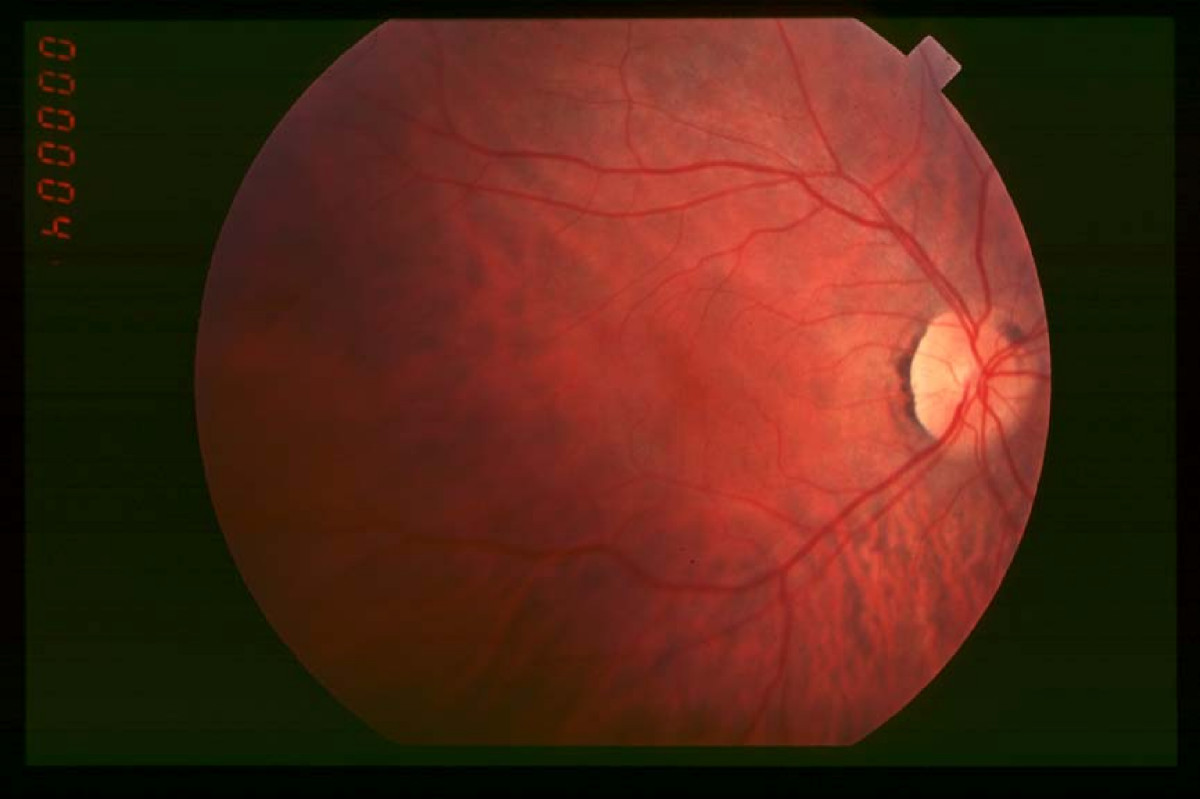
Fundus of person with retinitis pigmentosa, early stage

There is evidence to suggest genetic predilection for refractive error. Individuals that have parents with certain refractive errors are more likely to have similar refractive errors.

The Online Mendelian Inheritance in Man (OMIM) database has listed 261 genetic disorders in which myopia is one of the symptoms. Myopia may be present in heritable connective tissue disorders such as: Knobloch syndrome (OMIM 267750); Marfan syndrome (OMIM 154700); and Stickler syndrome (type 1, OMIM 108300; type 2, OMIM 604841). Myopia has also been reported in X-linked disorders caused by mutations in loci involved in retinal photoreceptor function (NYX, RP2, MYP1) such as: autosomal recessive congenital stationary night blindness (CSNB; OMIM 310500); retinitis pigmentosa 2 (RP2; OMIM 312600); and Bornholm eye disease (OMIM 310460). Many genes that have been associated with refractive error are clustered into common biological networks involved in connective tissue growth and extracellular matrix organization. Although a large number of chromosomal localisations have been associated with myopia (MYP1-MYP17), few specific genes have been identified.

=== Environmental ===
In studies of the genetic predisposition of refractive error, there is a correlation between environmental factors and the risk of developing myopia. Myopia has been observed in individuals with visually intensive occupations. Reading has also been found to be a predictor of myopia in children. It has been reported that children with myopia spent significantly more time reading than non-myopic children who spent more time playing outdoors. Additionally, focusing on near objects for long periods of time - such as when reading, looking at close screens, or writing - has been associated with myopia. Socioeconomic status and higher levels of education have also been reported to be a risk factor for myopia. Blepharoptosis can also induce refractive errors.

== Normal refraction ==
In order to see a clear image, the eye must focus rays of light on to the light-sensing part of the eye – the retina, which is located in the back of the eye. This focusing – called refraction – is performed mainly by the cornea and the lens, which are located at the front of the eye, the anterior segment.

When an eye focuses light correctly on to the retina when viewing distant objects, this is called emmetropia or being emmetropic. This means that the refractive power of the eye matches what is needed to focus parallel rays of light onto the retina. A distant object is defined as an object located beyond 6 meters (20 feet) from the eye.

When an object is located close to the eye, the rays of light from this object no longer approach the eye parallel to each other. Consequently, the eye must increase its refractive power to bring those rays of light together on the retina. This is called accommodation, and is accomplished by the eye thickening the lens.

== Diagnosis ==
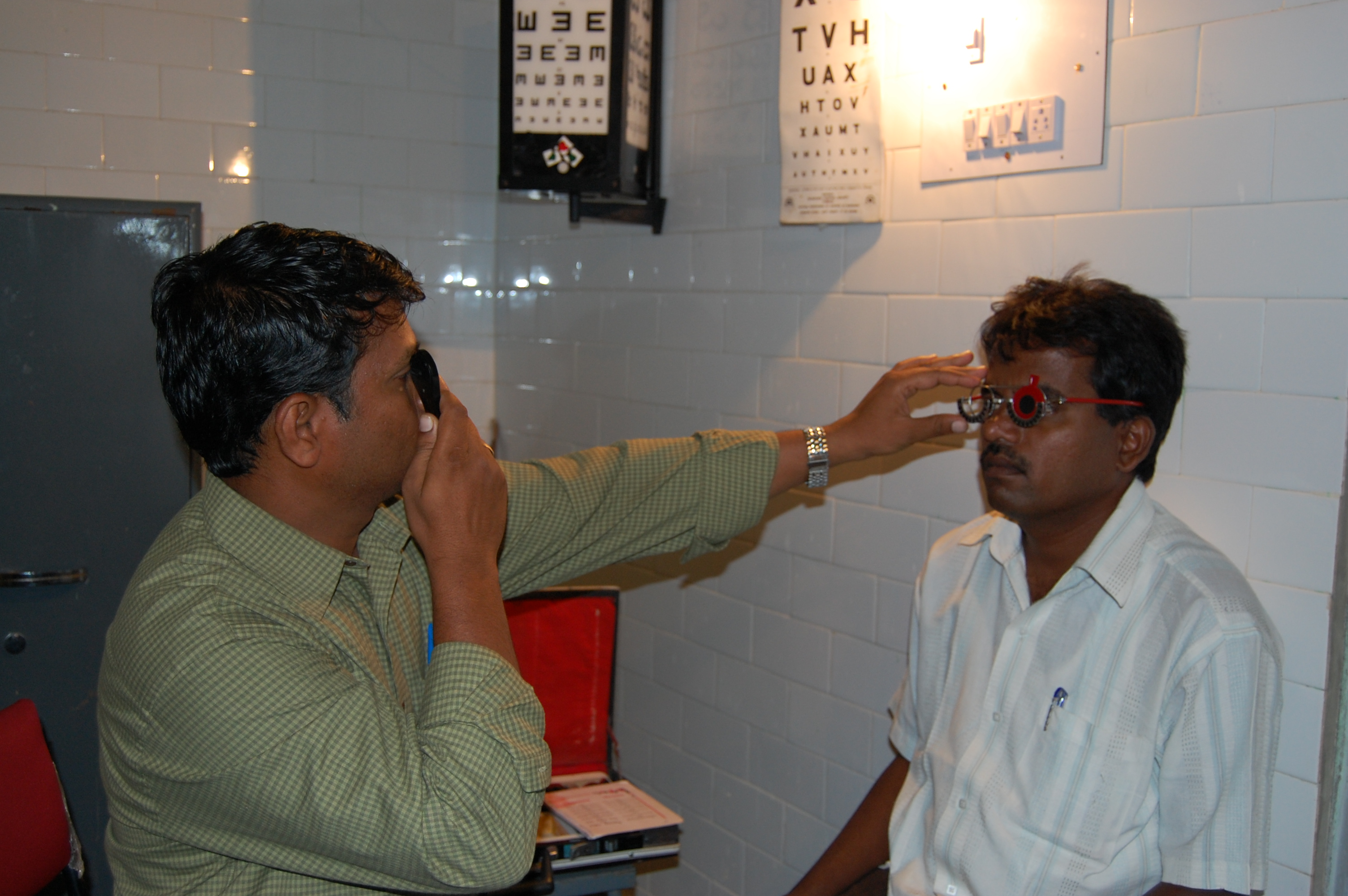
A doctor uses a trial frame and trial lenses to measure the person's refractive error.

Blurry vision may result from any number of conditions not necessarily related to refractive errors. The diagnosis of a refractive error is usually confirmed by an eye care professional during an eye examination using a large number of lenses of different optical powers, and often a retinoscope (a procedure entitled retinoscopy). The eye care professional instructs the patient to view a distant spot while the clinician changes the lenses held before the person's eye and watches the pattern of reflection of a small light shone on the eye. Once the clinician arrives at an estimate of the patient's "objective" refractive error, the clinician typically shows the patient lenses of progressively higher or weaker powers in a process known as subjective refraction. Cycloplegic agents are frequently used to more accurately determine the amount of refractive error, particularly in children.

An automated refractor is an instrument that is sometimes used in place of retinoscopy to objectively estimate a person's refractive error. Shack–Hartmann wavefront sensor and its inverse can also be used to characterize eye aberrations in a higher level of resolution and accuracy.

Vision defects caused by refractive error can be distinguished from other problems using a pinhole occluder, which will improve vision only in the case of refractive error.

== Screening ==
When refractive errors in children are not treated, the child may be at risk of developing ambylopia, where vision may remain permanently blurry. Because young children typically do not complain of blurry vision, the American Academy of Pediatrics recommends that children have yearly vision screening starting at three years old so that unknown refractive errors or other ophthalmic conditions can be found and treated if deemed necessary by healthcare professionals.

== Management ==
The management of refractive error is done post-diagnosis of the condition by either optometrists, ophthalmologists, refractionists, or ophthalmic medical practitioners.

How refractive errors are treated or managed depends upon the amount and severity of the condition. Those who possess mild amounts of refractive error may elect to leave the condition uncorrected, particularly if the person is asymptomatic. For those who are symptomatic, glasses, contact lenses, refractive surgery, or a combination are typically used.

=== Glasses ===
These are the most effective ways of correcting the refractive error. However, the availability and affordability of eyeglasses can present a difficulty for people in many low income settings of the world. Glasses also pose a challenge to children to whom they are prescribed, due to children's tendency to not wear them as consistently as recommended.

As mentioned earlier refractive errors are because of the improper focusing of the light in the retina. Eyeglasses work as an added lens of the eye serving to bend the light to bring it to focus on the retina. Depending on the eyeglasses, they serve many functions.

Reading glasses
These are general over-the-counter glasses which can be worn for easier reading, especially for defective vision due to aging called presbyopia.
Single vision prescription lenses
They can correct only one form of defective vision, either far-sightedness or near-sightedness.
Multifocal lenses
The multifocal lenses can correct defective vision in multiple focus, for example: near-vision as well as far-vision. This is particularly beneficial for presbyobia.

=== Contact lenses ===
Alternatively, many people choose to wear contact lenses. One style is hard contact lenses, which can distort the shape of the cornea to a desired shape. Another style, soft contact lenses, are made of silicone or hydrogel. Depending on the duration they are designed for, they may be worn daily or may be worn for an extended period of time, such as for weeks.

There are a number of complication associated with contact lenses. Typically the ones that are used daily.

Complications of contact lens wear	Description
Conjunctivitis (giant papillary form)	Caused in response to the allergen present in the material from which the contact lens is made from. There is often discomfort in the eye after wearing and vision may be affected. Choosing the right lens material and changing it regularly might prevent conjunctivitis.
Corneal abrasion	Caused by a foreign body, dust, sand, or grit trapped under the lens.
Corneal edema	Caused by decreased oxygen delivery to the tissue compressed by the lens. Usually resolved after the removal of the lenses. Discomfort upon lens removal may be seen.
Neovascularization	New blood vessels may form in the iris region and the limbus. This may impair vision.
Infections	Various viral, bacterial, and fungal infection may be seen in the eye post-contact-lens wear, if proper lens hygiene is not maintained. Acanthamoeba are the most common infections in the people using contact lenses.

If redness, itching, and difficulty in vision develops, the use of the lenses should be stopped immediately and the consultation of ophthalmologists may be sought.

=== Surgery ===
Laser in situ keratomileusis (LASIK) and photorefractive keratectomy (PRK) are popular procedures; while use of laser epithelial keratomileusis (LASEK) is increasing. Other surgical treatments for severe myopia include insertion of implants after clear lens extraction (refractive lens exchange). Full thickness corneal graft may be a final option for patients with advanced keratoconus although currently there is interest in new techniques that involve collagen crosslinking. As with any surgical procedure, complications may arise post-operatively. Post-operative monitoring is normally undertaken by the specialist ophthalmic surgical clinic and optometry services. Any patient reporting pain and redness after surgery should be referred urgently to their ophthalmic surgeon.

=== Medical treatment ===
Atropine is believed to slow the progression of near-sightedness when administered in combination with multifocal lenses. This, however, needs further research.

=== Prevention ===
Strategies being studied to slow worsening include adjusting working conditions, increasing the time children spend outdoors, and special types of contact lenses. In children special contact lenses appear to slow worsening of nearsightedness.

A number of questionnaires exist to determine quality of life impact of refractive errors and their correction.

== Epidemiology ==
DALYs per 100,000 people due to refractive errors in 2004. No data Less than 100 100–170 170–240 240–310 310–380 380–450 450–520 520–590 590–660 660–730 730–800 More than 800

It is estimated that at least 2 billion people in the world have refractive errors. The number of people globally with refractive errors that have not been corrected was estimated at 660 million (10 per 100 people) in 2013.

Refractive errors are the first common cause of visual impairment and second most common cause of visual loss. The assessment of refractive error is now done in DALY (disability-adjusted life years) which showed an 8% increase from 1990 to 2019.

The number of people globally with significant refractive errors has been estimated at one to two billion. Rates vary between regions of the world with about 25% of Europeans and 80% of Asians affected. Near-sightedness is one of the most prevalent disorders of the eye. Rates among adults are between 15 and 49% while rates among children are between 1.2 and 42%. Far-sightedness more commonly affects young children, whose eyes have yet to grow to their full length, and the elderly, who have lost the ability to compensate with their accommodation system. Presbyopia affects most people over the age of 35, and nearly 100% of people by the ages of 55–65. Uncorrected refractive error is responsible for visual impairment and disability for many people worldwide. It is one of the most common causes of vision loss along with cataracts, macular degeneration, and vitamin A deficiency.

== Cost ==
The yearly cost of correcting refractive errors is estimated at 3.9 to 7.2 billion dollars in the United States.

== See also ==
- Dioptre
- Focal length
- Optical power
