= Hoya Corporation =

Japanese optical products company

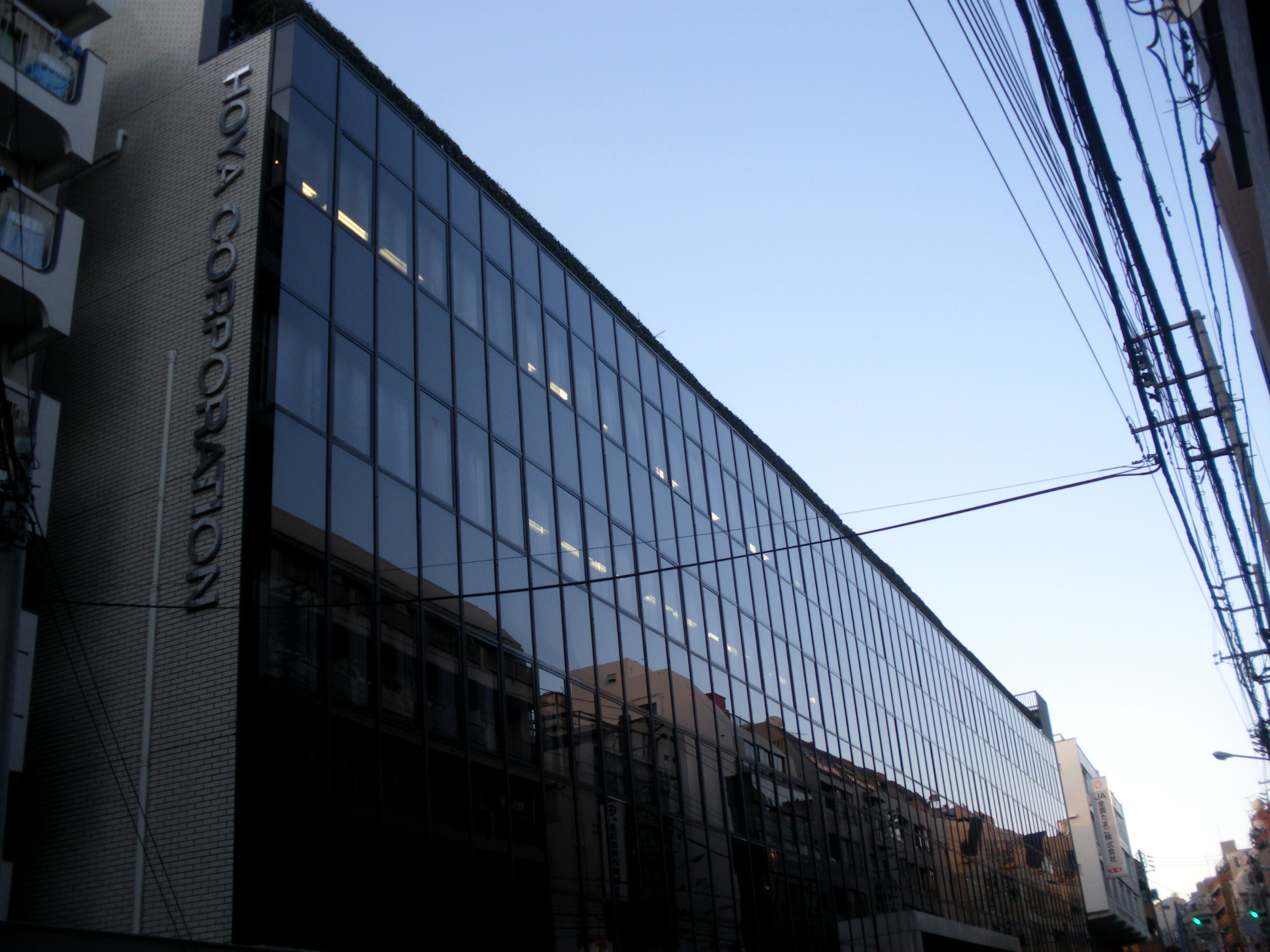
- Hoya headquarters in Tokyo
- Native name: HOYA株式会社
- Type: Public (K.K)
- Traded as: TYO: 7741; TOPIX Large 70 Component; TOPIX 100 Component
- Industry: Precision instruments
- Founded: Hoya, Japan (November 1, 1941; 84 years ago)
- Founders: Shoichi Yamanaka; Shigeru Yamanaka
- Headquarters: Shinjuku-ku, Tokyo 161-8525, Japan
- Key people: Eiichiro Ikeda (President and CEO)
- Products: Optical instruments; Medical equipment; Electronic components; Voice cloning
- Revenue: ▲JP¥ 490 billion (FY 2014) (US$ 4.1 billion) (FY 2014)
- Net income: ▲JP¥ 92.8 billion (FY 2014) (US$ 777 million) (FY 2014)
- Number of employees: 34,635 (as of March 31, 2015)
- Website: Official website

Hoya Corporation (Hoya株式会社, Hōya Kabushiki-gaisha) is a Japanese company manufacturing optical products such as photomasks, photomask blanks and hard disk drive platters, contact lenses and eyeglass lenses for the healthcare market, medical photonics, lasers, photographic filters, medical flexible endoscopy equipment, and software. Hoya Corporation is one of the Forbes Global 2000 Leading Companies and Industry Week 1000 Company.

== History of Hoya-Pentax merger ==
Hoya discussed a merger with Pentax into Hoya Pentax HD Corporation during 2007. Hoya's primary goal was to strengthen its medical-related business by taking advantage of Pentax's technologies and expertise in the field of endoscopes, intraocular lenses, surgical loupes, biocompatible ceramics, etc. It was speculated that Pentax's camera business could be sold off after the merger. The merger was initially intended to be completed by October 1, 2007. However, Pentax management decided to not pursue the originally planned share swap, and other options for a merger were discussed. On May 25, the Pentax board of directors accepted Hoya's offer for a merger. On August 6, 2007, Hoya completed a friendly takeover bid for Pentax and acquired 90.59% of the company. On October 29, 2007, Hoya and Pentax announced that Pentax, as the company ceasing to exist, will merge with and into Hoya on March 31, 2008.

The acquired Pentax surveying instrument business (later IT Asahi Co., Ltd.) and camera business (now Pentax Ricoh Imaging Co., Ltd.) were sold to Taiwan Instrument Co., Ltd. in 2009 and Ricoh Co., Ltd. in 2011, respectively.

== ReadSpeaker ==
On July 13, 2017, it was announced that Hoya had acquired ReadSpeaker. ReadSpeaker was founded in 1999 and headquartered in Huis ter Heide, Utrecht in the Netherlands at the time of the acquisition. ReadSpeaker is a text-to-speech technology that allows users to highlight words that are being spoken, and users can save the speech in an MP3 format. It has been used to transform websites to speech. The International Herald Tribune employed the tool to turn into podcasts the stories it publishes online. In a paper for the 2016 International Conference on Software Process Improvement, José Ortega and his coauthors said, ReadSpeaker "works 100% online, is a good reference but is commercial and costs."

=== Voice cloning ===
On 22 May 2025 it was claimed their voice product "Iona" was the result of recording work done by the actress Gayanne Potter in 2021 which at the time she understood would just be used for accessibility and e-learning software, but is now available generally and as the announcer on ScotRail trains.

== MiYOSMART ==
MiYOSMART is a DIMS lens made by Hoya to correct myopia. It was released in 2018. A three-year study found that it reduces myopia by 60% in children aged eight to thirteen years. It has a newer version called MiYOSMART iQ.

== See also ==
- List of companies of Japan
