= BVD (disambiguation) =

BVD and similar can mean:

- BVD, a brand of men's underwear
- BVD, back vertex distance, the distance between the back surface of a corrective lens and the front of the cornea.
- Binnenlandse Veiligheidsdienst (General Intelligence and Security Service), the former secret service of the Netherlands
- Bovine viral diarrhea, a disease of cattle
- Bureau van Dijk Electronic Publishing, a major publisher of business information
- BVD, the National Rail station code for Belvedere railway station, London, England
