= Peripheral defocus =

Peripheral defocus is the optical blur that occurs in the peripheral retina of the eye. It is an important factor in eye development and the progression of near-sightedness (myopia). In an uncorrected myopic eye, the central image focuses in front of the retina, while parts of the peripheral image may focus behind it, creating a relative hyperopic shift in the periphery. When light in the peripheral retina focuses behind the retina (hyperopic defocus), myopia is more likely to develop or worsen. Conversely, when peripheral light focuses in front of the retina (myopic defocus), eye growth tends to slow down.

== Theories of eye growth ==
The role of peripheral defocus in myopia was first proposed following a 1971 study of Dutch military pilots. This study found that pilots with eyes elongated along the visual axis relative to their equatorial width were at a greater risk of developing myopia. Researchers hypothesized that hyperopic defocus in the peripheral retina could be triggering the onset of myopia. Later studies revealed that an elongated eye shape is more likely a result of myopia rather than its cause, although peripheral hyperopic defocus remains a recognized factor in the continued progression of the condition.

Animal research highlights the peripheral retina's major role in regulating eye growth. Studies on rhesus monkeys demonstrated that even after the central fovea was destroyed, the eye still adjusted its refractive state. This indicates that peripheral regions independently guide emmetropization. Animal experiments further show that eye growth regulation is largely independent of the brain. Severing the optic nerve has little effect on growth responses driven by defocus, and covering half of the visual field with a translucent diffuser only causes overgrowth in that specific half of the eye.

When exposed to blur, the peripheral retina releases chemical mediators such as dopamine, retinoic acid, and nitric oxide. In animal models like chickens, the choroid responds to these signals within minutes to hours. It expands when myopic defocus is applied and thins under hyperopic defocus, which effectively repositions the retina closer to or further from the focal plane. Over time, these signals alter the composition of the scleral extracellular matrix, causing the eye to elongate and shift toward a more myopic state.

== Measurement and assessment ==
Peripheral defocus is assessed through measurements of peripheral refraction, which quantify refractive errors at different retinal eccentricities away from the fovea. Unlike conventional refraction measurements that primarily describe the central visual field, peripheral refraction measurements evaluate refractive characteristics at locations outside the foveal region.

Peripheral refraction can be measured by assessing refractive status at different retinal locations outside the foveal region. Such measurements provide information about the distribution of refractive characteristics across the peripheral retina.

Accurate measurement of peripheral refraction is important for investigating its association with myopia development and the effects of optical interventions. The availability of instrumentation that allows comfortable and repeatable measurements in subjects, including children, and supports continuous and large-scale use is important for improving access to peripheral refraction data. Emerging approaches, such as Refraction Topography, have been applied to measure the peripheral refractive characteristics across different retinal regions in children and adolescents.

== Optical devices and management ==
Various optical devices are designed to create a myopic peripheral defocus to slow the progression of myopia in children. Standard single-vision spectacles provide a uniform correction that focuses the central image clearly on the retina. However, this correction leaves the periphery of the image focused behind the retina. This creates a hyperopic defocus that can stimulate continued axial eye growth, a problem that worsens with stronger prescriptions. Specialized options to address this issue include:

- Spectacle lenses: Bifocals and progressive addition lenses were historically used to control eye growth, particularly for children with focusing difficulties. However, clinical trials comparing progressive lenses to single-vision lenses found only a 0.20 diopter improvement over three years, which is a statistically significant but clinically modest difference. Newer spectacle designs take a different approach by generating myopic peripheral defocus while maintaining a clear central zone for distance vision. For instance, DIMS lenses (Hoya MiyoSmart) embed hundreds of tiny positive-power lenslets in a honeycomb pattern around a clear central zone. These add +3.50 diopters of relative power, projecting light to focal points in front of the retina. Highly Aspherical Lenslet Target (HALT) lenses (Essilor Stellest) surround a clear central zone with rings of strongly curved lenslets, which are shaped to spread defocused light across a broad region in front of the peripheral retina. Cylindrical Annular Refractive Elements (CARE) lenses (Zeiss MyoCare) alternate concentric rings of small cylindrical optical elements with distance-correcting zones to generate retinal defocus at multiple points simultaneously. These newer designs have proven highly effective at slowing myopia progression in clinical trials. At a one-year follow-up, DIMS and HALT lenses showed similar performance and both were superior to CARE lenses. Older designs that only tried to reduce peripheral hyperopia, like Zeiss MyoVision, yielded less consistent results. While one trial noted benefits for children with myopic parents, a subsequent trial in Japan found no meaningful overall effect.
- Contact lenses: Orthokeratology uses rigid gas-permeable contact lenses worn overnight to temporarily reshape the cornea. This flattens the central cornea and steepens the mid-periphery, shifting the peripheral focal plane forward and producing a myopic defocus signal. Studies indicate this method reduces myopia progression by approximately 50%. Soft contact lens options, such as dual-focus designs like MiSight, extended depth of focus lenses, and high-addition multifocals, use concentric optical zones or continuous power gradients. These provide distance correction through the center while placing defocused light in front of the peripheral retina. Depending on the specific design and the length of the study, the reported efficacy for these soft lenses ranges from roughly 25% to over 70%.

== Sources ==
- Erdinest, N; London, N; Lavy, I; Berkow, D; Landau, D; Morad, Y; Levinger, N (2023). "Peripheral Defocus and Myopia Management: A Mini-Review". Korean J Ophthalmol. 37 (1): 70–81. doi:10.3341/kjo.2022.0125.
- Morgan, Ian G.; Rose, Kathryn A.; Ashby, Regan S. (2021). "Animal Models of Experimental Myopia: Limitations and Synergies with Studies on Human Myopia". Pathologic Myopia. Springer. pp. 67–85. doi:10.1007/978-3-030-74334-5_6.
- Vitiello, Livio; Lixi, Filippo; Calabresi, Valerio; Troisi, Mario; De Pascale, Ilaria; Pellegrino, Alfonso; Coco, Giulia; Vagge, Aldo; Giannaccare, Giuseppe (2025). "The Role of Spectacle Lenses in the Control and Management of Myopia Progression: A Narrative Review". Life. 15 (1415). doi:10.3390/life15091415. PMC 12471217.
