= Myopic crescent =

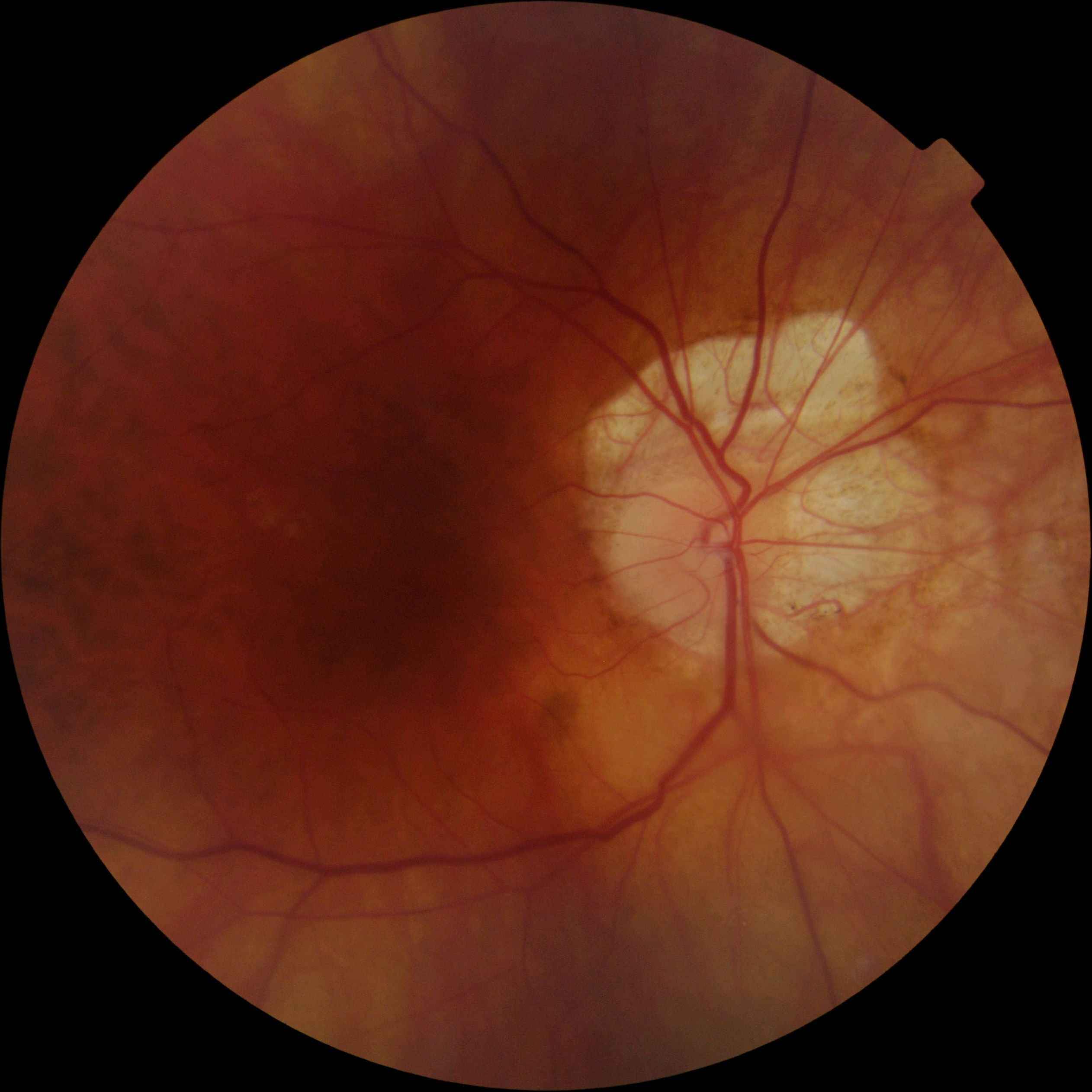
- Large myopic crescent in right eye with peripapillary choroidal atrophy.

A myopic crescent is a moon-shaped feature that can develop at the temporal (lateral) border of disc (it rarely occurs at the nasal border) of myopic eyes. It is primarily caused by atrophic changes that are genetically determined, with a minor contribution from stretching due to elongation of the eyeball. In myopia that is no longer progressing, the crescent may be asymptomatic except for its presence on ocular examination. However, in high-degree myopia, it may extend to the upper and lower borders, or form a complete ring around the optic disc and form a central scotoma.

The myopic crescent is commonly seen in pathological axial myopia. The condition sometimes described erroneously as myopic choroiditis, but myopic crescent is not an inflammatory process and does not run parallel to the degree of myopia. It usually tends to occur after mid adult life. Myopic crescent is often associated with some degree of retinal degeneration and occasionally vitreous degeneration.
