= Ultrasound biomicroscopy =

Ultrasound eye exam

- Purpose: ultrasound eye exam

Ultrasound biomicroscopy (UBM) is a type of ultrasound eye exam that makes a more detailed image than regular ultrasound.

== Operation ==
High-energy sound waves are bounced off the inside of the eye and the echo patterns are shown on the screen of an ultrasound machine. This makes a picture called a sonogram.

== Ocular use ==
It is useful in glaucoma, cysts and neoplasms of the eye, as well as the evaluation of trauma and foreign bodies of the eye.
