= Instrument myopia =

Medical condition

Instrument myopia is the tendency of a person with normal eyes to focus them too close when looking into an optical instrument at its image. Optical instruments include viewfinders, telescopes, binoculars, and microscopes. For example, through a microscope, a person might focus the eyes to one meter distance although it can present an image at six meters distance.

== Characteristics ==
Ordinarily, when someone looks at an object at, say, one meter from the eyes, the eyes make reflex adjustments so the object appears single and clear. That is, the eyes converge on the object, to bring its image in each eye onto the central part of each retina, the fovea. This ensures that the person sees one object instead of two, and is referred to as singleness of vision or binocular fusion. The focussing of each eye, its accommodation, is adjusted so the retinal image of the object is as sharp as possible. This is done via contraction of the ciliary muscles controlling the shape of the crystalline lens of the eye. Although convergence and accommodation are separate processes, they normally operate synergistically.

When someone looks into an optical instrument, such as a microscope, vision is far from ordinary. A microscope might force the person to use only one eye, it presents the person with a limited field of view, it presents a magnified view, and it allows the person to adjust the focus of the instrument for any viewing distance. Ideally, the person will choose a focus adjustment on the instrument that allows the eyes to have relaxed accommodation—that is to present the image(s) at a distance of about 6 meters, or optical infinity. However, most people tend to accommodate to nearer than 6 m. It is this too-close focussing of the eyes that is instrument myopia.

Accommodating to a distance nearer than 6 meters makes the ciliary muscles work harder than they need to, leading to fatigue. Some binocular microscopes are designed so that the vergence of the eyes is correct for a 6-meter viewing distance. Accommodating to a closer distance will tend to converge the eyes, leading to double vision.

According to Wesner and Miller (1986), instrument myopia is promoted when the viewing is with one eye, when the field of view is small, and when the luminance is low, concluding that these are consistent with accommodation's going towards a person's dark focus, which is about one meter from the eyes. Wesner and Miller also said it is possible that a person's knowledge that the viewed object is very close (on the microscope stage) contributes to instrument myopia. They said that instrument myopia is minimised by using a binocular microscope that forces the person's vergence angle to be small.

== History ==
Richards attributed early research into instrument myopia to H. Imbert in 1899. Early mention of the term occurred in 1970, or earlier.
