= Defocus Incorporated Multiple Segments lens =

MiyoSmart lens that slows the progression of myopia in children

The Defocus Incorporated Multiple Segments lens (DIMS lens), commercially known as MiyoSmart, is a type of spectacle lens primarily developed to manage and slow the progression of myopia in children.

== Design and specifications ==
The lens uses a dual-zone optical design. Its center consists of a 9 millimeter clear zone for standard distance-vision correction. Surrounding this is a roughly 33 millimeter treatment zone that produces controlled peripheral defocus. This outer zone contains 396 small segments arranged in a honeycomb pattern, each 1.03 millimeters across and carrying +3.50 diopters of added positive power. These segments project light to focal points ahead of the retina, generating a defocus signal that discourages the eye from elongating while leaving central vision unaffected.

The lens material is polycarbonate (refractive index 1.590), with an anti-reflective coating and a hydrophobic surface treatment that helps keep the lens clear of water and debris. The available prescription range covers myopia up to −6.50 diopters, astigmatism up to −4.00 diopters, and prism correction up to 3.00 diopters per lens.

== Clinical efficacy ==
A pilot study on school-aged children, presented at the 16th International Myopia Conference (2018), found that wearers experienced 59 percent less myopic progression compared with controls. Researchers have also suggested that the technology could have a role in preventing myopia from developing in the first place, though this would depend on whether non-myopic children can comfortably tolerate the lenses.

In a two-year double-masked randomized trial involving Chinese children aged 8 to 13, those assigned to DIMS lenses progressed 52 percent more slowly in myopia and showed 62 percent less axial elongation than the single-vision control group. Among the DIMS wearers, roughly one in five (21.5 percent) showed no measurable myopia increase over the full study period. When participants were tracked for up to six years, the myopia-slowing benefit persisted, and children who stopped wearing the lenses did not experience an accelerated return of progression. A separate retrospective analysis found that a small proportion (2.7 percent) of long-term wearers actually had a measurable reduction in axial length after more than two years of use.

Recent retrospective studies in European clinical settings, including Germany and Italy, have confirmed the effectiveness of DIMS lenses in real-world scenarios. These studies found that the treatment is generally more successful in children older than 10 years. Younger children, those with astigmatism, and those whose mothers have high myopia appear to respond less well.

A 2025 randomized double-blind clinical trial evaluating myopic Chinese children aged seven to 14 found that DIMS lenses significantly slowed the progression of the condition compared to standard single-vision lenses. Over a one-year period, children wearing DIMS lenses experienced an average myopic progression of −0.27 diopters, compared to −0.55 diopters for those wearing single-vision spectacles. The study also assessed vision-related quality of life using a standardized questionnaire, finding no significant difference between the two groups, suggesting that the myopia-control benefits of DIMS lenses came without a measurable trade-off in the children's everyday visual experience.

In a study of 20 to 30-year-old adults no positive (or negative) effects were found.

== Side effects and adaptation ==
Short-term studies have found no meaningful differences in standard visual measures or cortical responses between DIMS and conventional lenses, but longer observation periods (24 months) have revealed shifts in binocular coordination and accommodative function. New wearers commonly report an adjustment period involving complaints such as peripheral blur, headaches, halos, and eye fatigue, though these symptoms tend to diminish over time. Despite these temporary side effects, overall satisfaction and quality of life remain high among users.

== Sources ==
- He, Mingguang; Chen, Yanxian; Hu, Yin (2019-10-09). "Prevention of Myopia Onset". In Ang, Marcus; Wong, Tien Y. (eds.). Updates on Myopia: A Clinical Perspective. Springer Nature. p. 180. ISBN 978-981-13-8491-2.
- Li, Xiaoying; Ma, Wei; Song, Yutong; Yap, Maurice; Liu, Longqian (2025). "Comparison of Myopic Progression and Quality of Life Wearing Either DIMs Lenses or Single-Vision Myopia Correcting Spectacles". Journal of Ophthalmology. 2025 9959251: 1–12. doi:10.1155/joph/9959251. PMC 11839264. PMID 39974171.
- Vitiello, Livio; Lixi, Filippo; Calabresi, Valerio; Troisi, Mario; De Pascale, Ilaria; Pellegrino, Alfonso; Coco, Giulia; Vagge, Aldo; Giannaccare, Giuseppe (2025). "The Role of Spectacle Lenses in the Control and Management of Myopia Progression: A Narrative Review". Life. 15 (1415): 1415. Bibcode:2025Life...15.1415V. doi:10.3390/life15091415. PMC 12471217. PMID 41010357.
- Wojtczak-Kwaśniewska, Monika; Domagalski, Mikołaj; Dymczyk, Maciej; Padurska, Maria; Przekoracka, Katarzyna; Przekoracka-Krawczyk, Anna (2025). "Do myopia control spectacle lenses with defocus incorporated multiple segments technology alter visual parameters and cortical activity?". Ophthalmic and Physiological Optics. 45 (4): 982–994. doi:10.1111/opo.13513. ISSN 0275-5408. PMID 40238131.
