= Duochrome test =

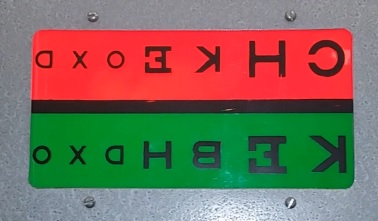

A duochrome test is a test commonly used to refine the final sphere in refraction (under-correction and over-correction), which makes use of the longitudinal chromatic aberration of the eye. Because of the chromatic aberration of the eye, the shorter wavelengths (green) are focused in front of the longer red wavelengths. It is assumed that best vision is attained when the yellow wavelengths are focused on the retina.

== Testing ==
The person is asked to compare the clarity of the letters on the green and the red side. If the letters of the green side are clearer +0.25 D sphere is added and if the letters on the red side are clearer -0.25 D sphere is added. With optimal spherical correction, the letters on the red and green halves of the chart appear equally clear.

Because this test is based on chromatic aberration and not on color discrimination, it is used even with people having color vision deficiency.

The eye with overactive accommodation may still require too much minus sphere in order to balance the red and green. Cycloplegia may be necessary.

The duochrome test is not used with patients whose visual acuity is worse than 20/30 (6/9), because the 0.50 D difference between the two sides is too small to distinguish.

== See also ==
- Eye examination
- Subjective refraction
