= Vertex distance =

Measure in optics

Vertex distance

Vertex distance is the distance between the back surface of a corrective lens, i.e. glasses (spectacles) or contact lenses, and the front of the cornea. Increasing or decreasing the vertex distance changes the optical properties of the system, by moving the focal point forward or backward, effectively changing the power of the lens relative to the eye. Since most refractions (the measurement that determines the power of a corrective lens) are performed at a vertex distance of 12–14 mm, the power of the correction may need to be modified from the initial prescription so that light reaches the patient's eye with the same effective power that it did through the phoropter or trial frame.

Vertex distance is important when converting between contact lens and glasses prescriptions and becomes significant if the glasses prescription is beyond ±4.00 diopters (often abbreviated D). The formula for vertex correction is $F_c = \left(F^{-1} - x\right)^{-1}$, where F_{c} is the power corrected for vertex distance, F is the original lens power, and x is the change in vertex distance in meters.

The effect can also be noticed by moving the glasses further away from the eyes. For a short-sighted person, this weakens the effective strength of the lens, which may make it easier to read text up close. More plus power or less minus power as you move the glasses further away from the eye.

== Derivation ==
The vertex distance formula calculates what power lens (F_{c}) is needed to focus light on the same location if the lens has been moved by a distance x. To focus light to the same image location:

$$f_c = f - x$$

where f_{c} is the corrected focal length for the new lens, f is the focal length of the original lens, and x is the distance that the lens was moved. The value for x can be positive or negative depending on the sign convention. Lens power in diopters is the mathematical inverse of focal length in meters.

$$\begin{align}
F &= \frac{1}{f}; & F_\text{c} &= \frac{1}{f_\text{c}}
\end{align}$$

Substituting for lens power arrives at

$$\frac{1}{F_\text{c}} = \frac{1}{F} - x$$

After simplifying the final equation is found:

$$\begin{align}
&            & \frac{F}{F_\text{c}} &= 1 - xF \\
&\Rightarrow &           F_\text{c} &= \frac{F}{1 - xF} = \frac{1}{\frac{1}{F} - x} \\
&\Rightarrow &                    F &= \frac{1}{\frac{1}{F_\text{c}} + x}
\end{align}$$

== Examples ==
=== Example 1: example prescription adjustment from glasses to contacts ===
A phoropter measurement of a patient reads −8.00 D sphere and −5.25 D cylinder with an axis of 85° for one eye (the notation for which is typically written as −8 −5.25×85). The phoropter measurement is made at a common vertex distance of 12 mm from the eye. The equivalent prescription at the patient's cornea (say, for a contact lens) can be calculated as follows (this example assumes a negative cylinder sign convention):

Power 1 is the spherical value, and power 2 is the steeper power of the astigmatic axis:

$$\begin{align}
\text{Corrected power}_1 &= F_{\text{c}1} = \frac{1}{\frac{1}{F} - x} = \frac{1}{\frac{1}{-8} - 0.012} = -7.30\text{ D}, \\[3pt]
\text{Uncorrected power}_2 &= F_\text{sphere} + F_\text{cylinder} = -8 + -5.25 = -13.25\text{ D}, \\[3pt]
\text{Corrected power}_2 &= F_{\text{c}2} = \frac{1}{\frac{1}{F} - x} = -\frac{13.25}{1 - 0.012 (-13.25)} = -11.43\text{ D}, \text{ and} \\[3pt]
\text{Corrected cylinder} &= F_{\text{c}2} - F_{\text{c}1} = -11.43 - (-7.30) = -4.13\text{ D}.
\end{align}$$

The axis value does not change with vertex distance, so the equivalent prescription for a contact lens (vertex distance, 0 mm) is −7.30 D of sphere, −4.13 D of cylinder with 85° of axis (−7.30 −4.13×85 or about −7.25 −4.25×85).

=== Example 2: example prescription adjustment from contacts to glasses ===
A patient has −8 D sphere contacts. What is the equivalent prescription for glasses?

$$F = \frac{1}{\frac{1}{F_\text{c}} + x} = \frac{1}{\frac{1}{-8} + 0.012} = -8.84\text{ D}$$

Therefore −8 D contacts correspond to −8.75 D or −9 D glasses.

=== Example 3: sample plots ===
Corrected and uncorrected spherical power for a vertex distance of 12 mm.

Difference in spherical power at a vertex distance of 12 mm versus 0 mm.

The following plots show the difference in spherical power at a 0 mm vertex distance (at the eye) and a 12 mm vertex distance (standard eyeglasses distance). 0 mm is used as the reference starting power and is one-to-one. The second plot shows the difference between the 0 mm and 12 mm vertex distance powers. Above around 4D of spherical power, the difference versus the corrected power becomes more than 0.25 D and is clinically significant.
