= Ophthalmic trial frame =

Tool used in eye examination

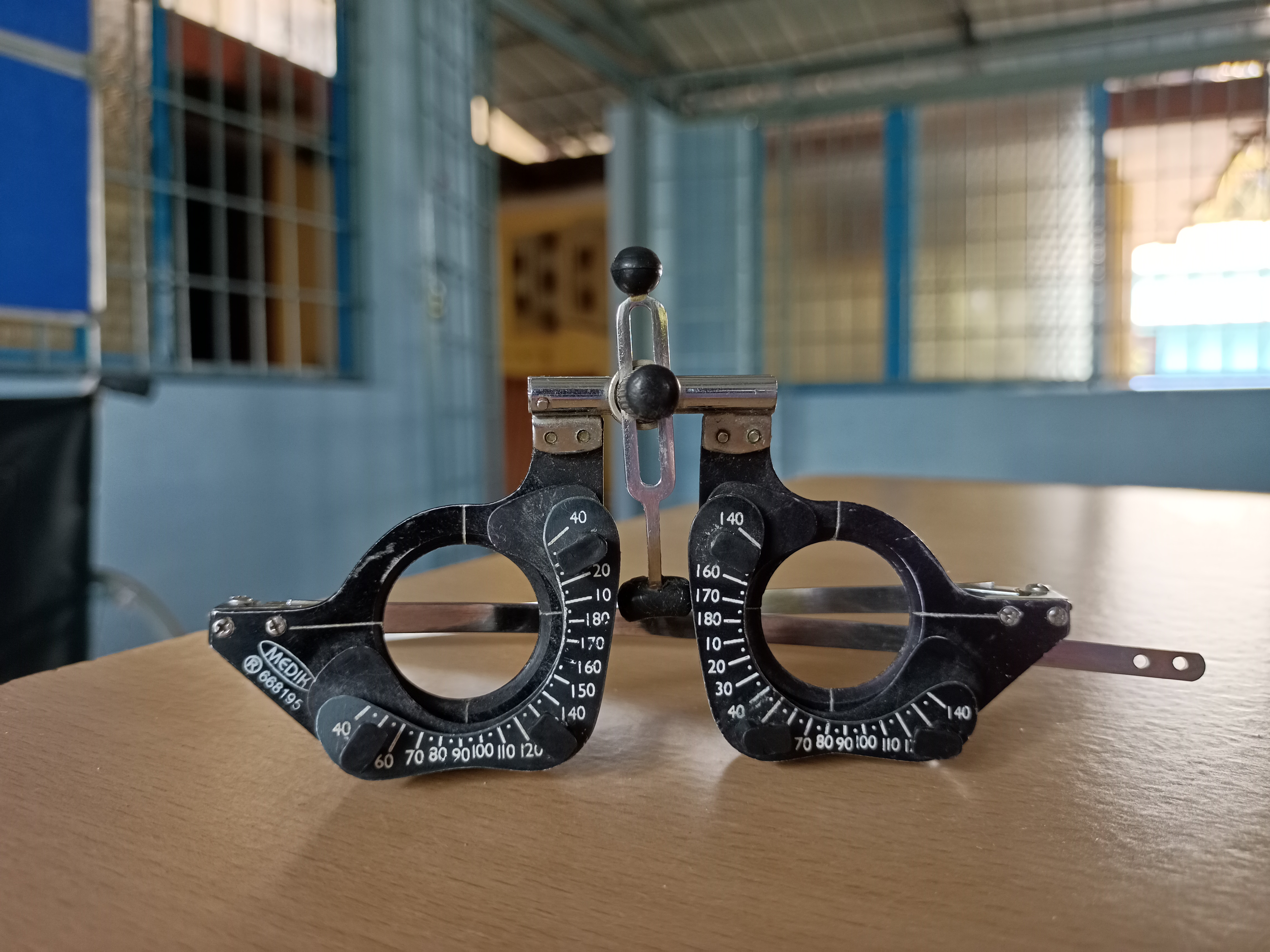
- Ophthalmic trial frame
- Purpose: ophthalmic trial frame is used to hold lenses and other accessories during correction of refractive errors.
- Test of: Visual acuity

A trial frame is a tool used by ophthalmic professionals like ophthalmologists and optometrists. It is basically an adjustable spectacle frame with multiple cells, used to hold corrective lenses, and other accessories in subjective refraction (finding the correct spectacle power) and retinoscopy.

== Uses ==
To measure a patient's refractive error, squint and presbyopia, it is used to hold lenses, prism or other tools like pinhole occluder. The cells of the trial frame allow holding lenses in correct position.

Although phoropters, which contains lenses allow a quicker refraction, the trial frame help to test near vision at the patient's preferred working distance and position. Since it is portable, a trial frame is ideal for vision and refraction screening during home (domiciliary) visits and outreach camps. Since it allows more natural vision, trial frame refraction is preferred for patients with low vision patients.

== Parts ==
An ideal trial frame have minimum 3 cells, one each for holding spherical lens, cylindrical lens and other tools like occluder or pinhole. Angle for axis of astigmatism is marked on outermost visible cell there are knobs to adjust pupillary distance, side angle, height and cylindrical lens axis. The nosepiece assembly can be moved front-back and up-down for correct positioning of the lenses in front of the eyes. The length of the legs can also be adjusted. The positions of the two side assemblies give exact measurement of interpupillary distance.

== Modern Techniques ==
The majority of trial frames are manufactured using combinations of metal and plastic parts using injection moulding techniques. Newer trial frame like the OICO TF-4use additive SLS 3D printing to reduce the number of parts.

== Additional images ==
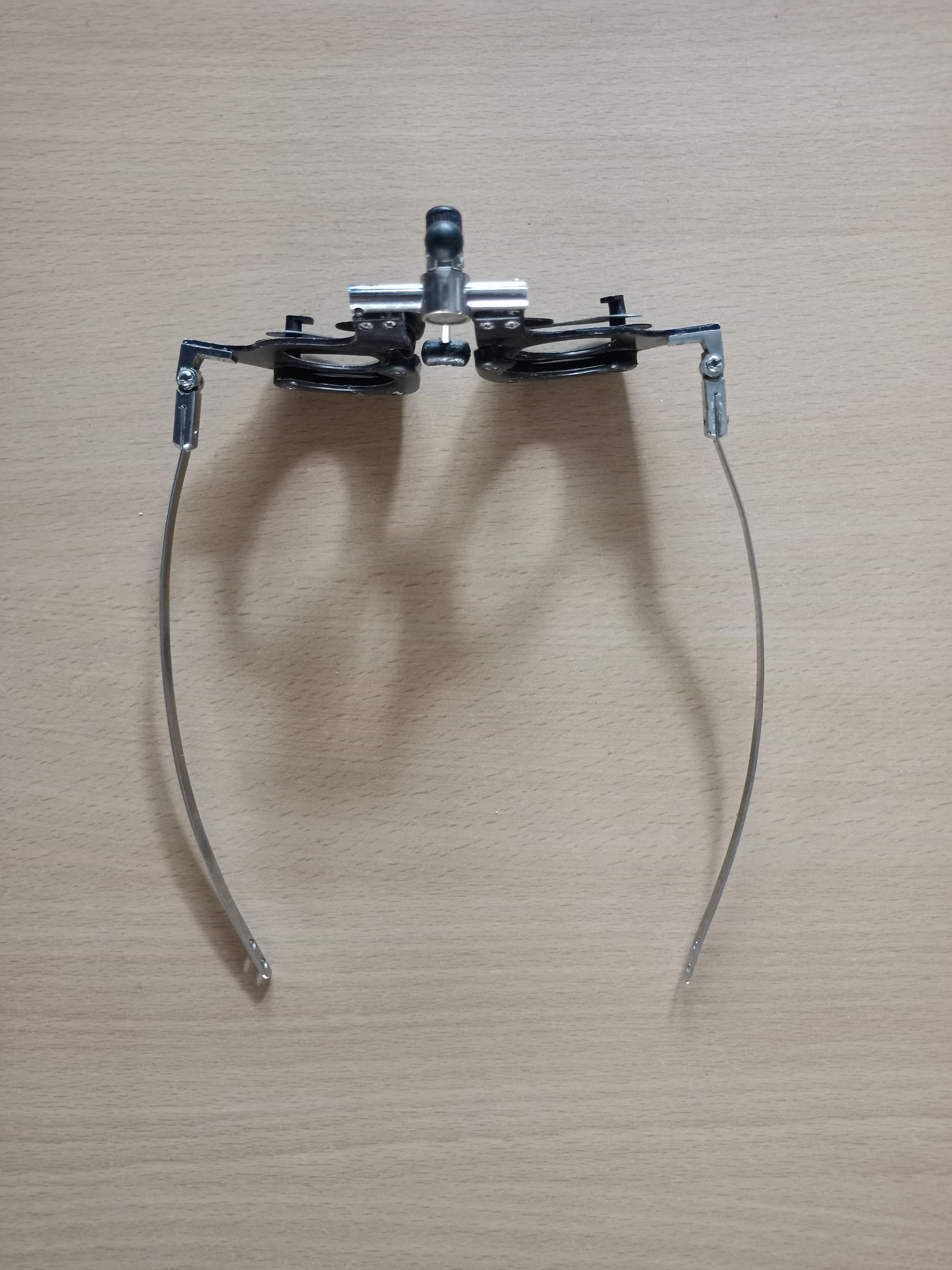
upside view of a trial frame

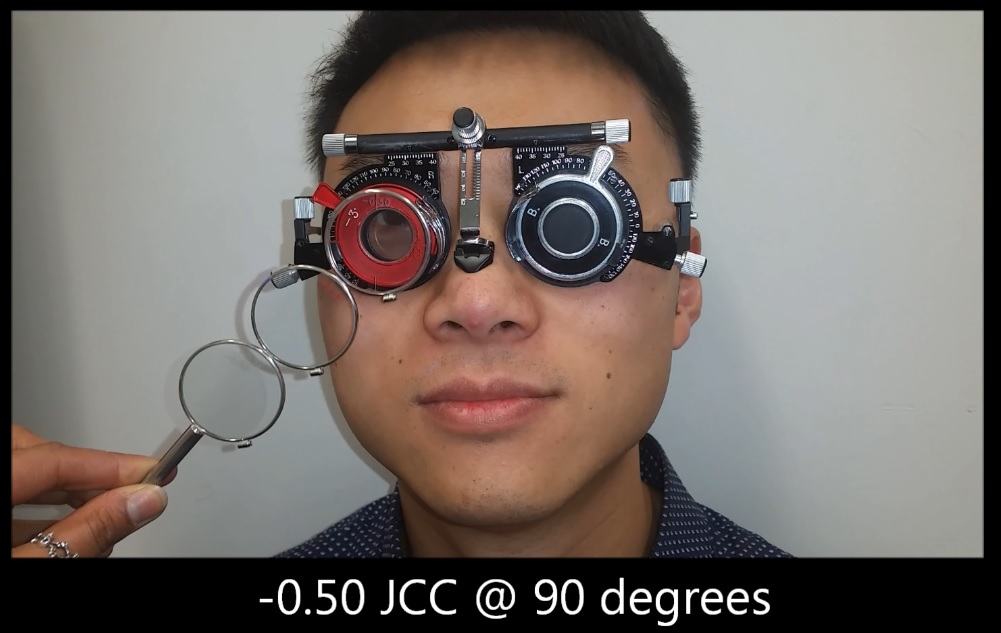
a patient wearing trial frame while doing test for astigmatism

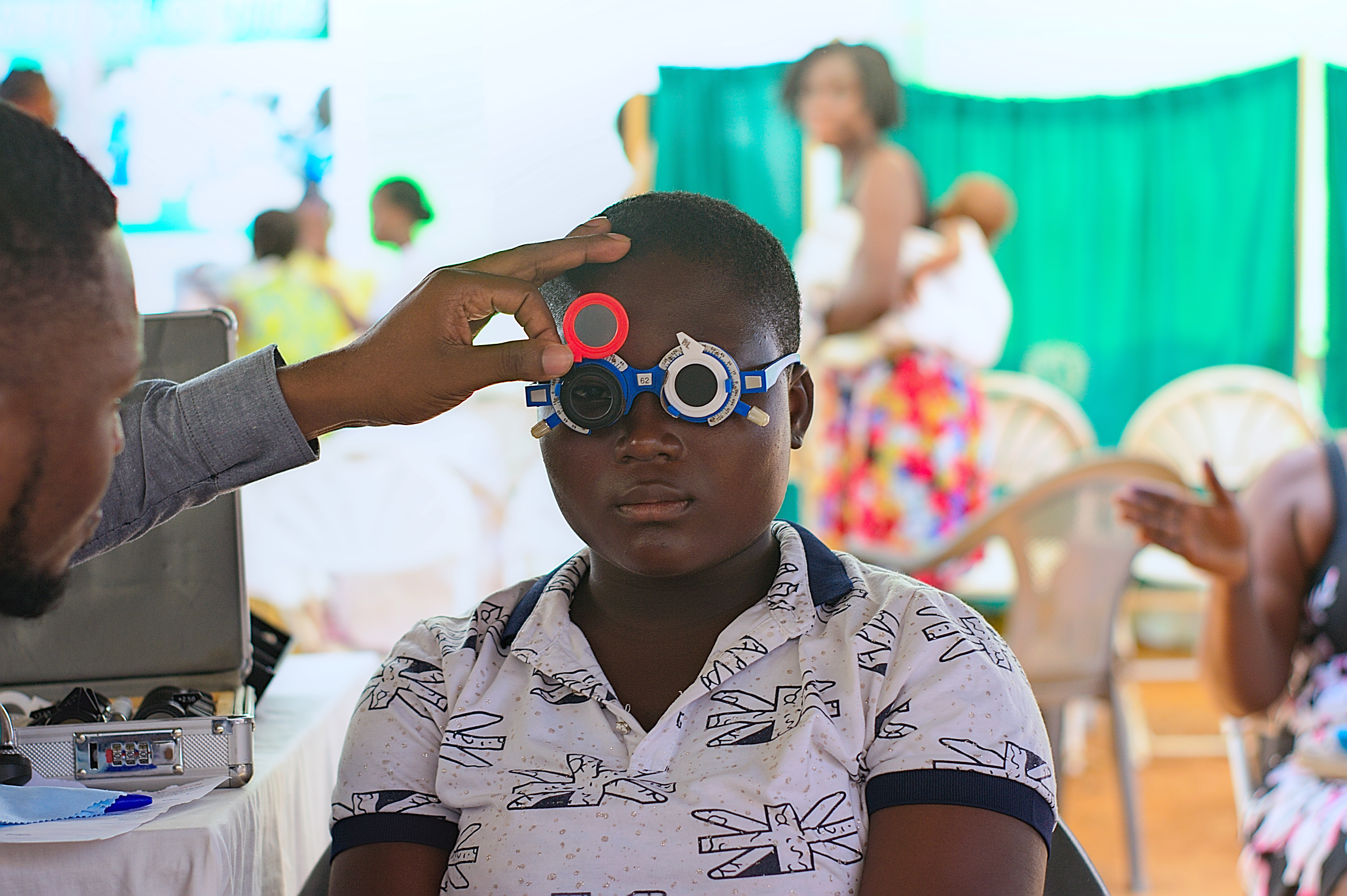
a patient wearing trial frame while doing refraction

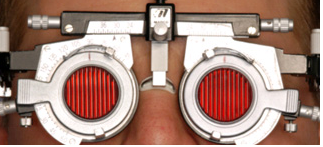
Double Maddox rod test with trial frames
