= Myopia =

Inability to focus on distant objects

- Other names: nearsightedness, short-sightedness
- Diagram showing light focusing in front of the retina in an eye with myopia. The blue line is where the retina is supposed to be in a healthy eye, however, the eye has grown too long
- Specialty: Ophthalmology, optometry
- Symptoms: Distant objects appear blurry, headaches, eye strain
- Complications: Retinal detachment, cataracts, glaucoma
- Usual onset: Childhood (typically), adulthood (rarely)
- Duration: Typically permanent
- Causes: Combination of genetic and environmental factors
- Risk factors: Near work, greater time spent indoors, family history
- Diagnostic method: Eye examination
- Prevention: Increased time outdoors, atropine, red light therapy, orthokeratology
- Treatment: Eyeglasses, contact lenses, orthokeratology, surgery
- Prognosis: Generally stable after early adulthood
- Frequency: Approximately 30% of people globally

Myopia, also known as nearsightedness or short-sightedness, is an eye condition where light from distant objects focuses in front of, instead of on, the retina. As a result, distant objects appear blurry, while close objects appear normal. Other symptoms may include headaches and eye strain. Severe myopia is associated with an increased risk of macular degeneration, retinal detachment, cataracts, and glaucoma.

Myopia results from the length of the eyeball growing too long or less commonly the lens or cornea being too strong. It is a type of refractive error. Diagnosis is by eye examination with an eye chart.

Myopia is less common in people who spent more time outside during childhood. This lower risk may be due to greater exposure to sunlight. Myopia can be corrected with eyeglasses, contact lenses, or by refractive surgery. Eyeglasses are the simplest and safest method of correction. Contact lenses can provide a relatively wider corrected field of vision, but are associated with an increased risk of infection. Refractive surgeries such as LASIK and PRK permanently change the shape of the cornea. Other procedures include implantable collamer lens (ICL) placement inside the anterior chamber in front of the natural eye lens. ICL does not affect the cornea.

Myopia is the most common eye disorder and is estimated to affect 1.5 billion people (22% of the world population). Rates vary significantly in different areas of the world. Rates among adults are between 15% and 49%. Among children, it affects 1% of rural Nepalese, 4% of South Africans, 12% of people in the US, and 37% in some large Chinese cities. In China the proportion of girls is slightly higher than boys. Rates have increased since the 1950s. Uncorrected myopia is one of the most common causes of vision impairment globally along with cataracts, macular degeneration, and vitamin A deficiency.

== Signs and symptoms ==
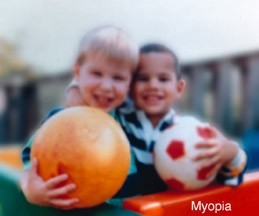
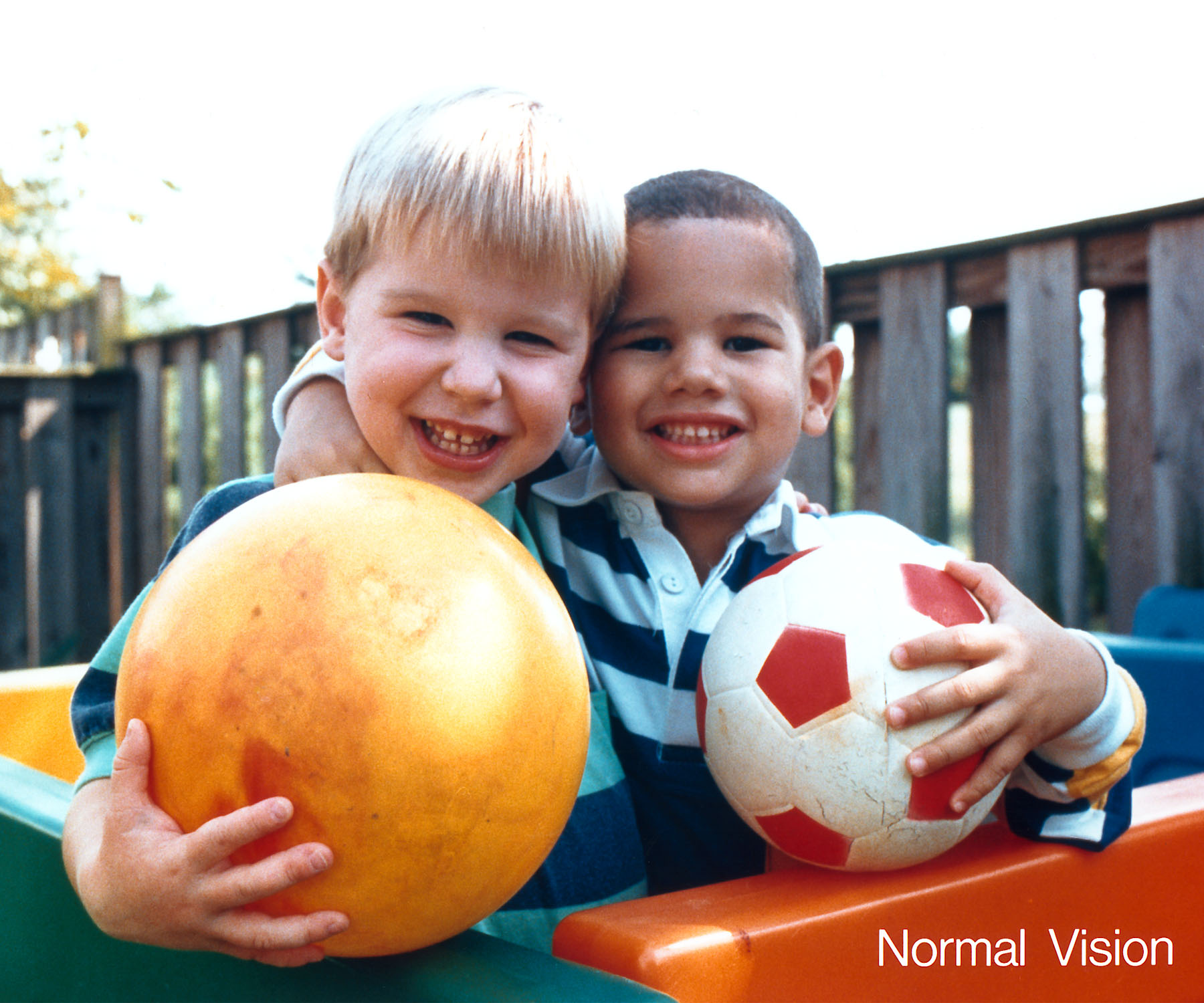
Myopic vision vs. normal vision

A person with myopia can see clearly out to a certain distance (the far point of the eye), but objects placed beyond this distance appear blurred. If the extent of the myopia is great enough, even standard reading distances can be affected. Upon routine examination of the eyes, the vast majority of myopic eyes appear structurally identical to nonmyopic eyes.

Onset is often in school children, with worsening between the ages of 8 and 15.

== Causes ==
The underlying cause of myopia is believed to be a combination of genetic and environmental factors. Risk factors include doing work that involves focusing on close objects, greater time spent indoors, urbanization, and a family history of the condition. It is also associated with a high socioeconomic class and higher level of education.

A 2012 review could not find strong evidence for any single cause, although many theories have been discredited. Twin studies indicate that at least some genetic factors are involved. Myopia has been increasing rapidly throughout the developed world, suggesting environmental factors are involved.

The role of corrective lenses interfering with emmetropization has also been suggested.

=== Genetics ===
A risk for myopia may be inherited from one's parents. Genetic linkage studies have identified 18 possible locations (loci) on 15 different chromosomes that are associated with myopia, but none of these loci is part of the candidate genes that cause myopia. Instead of a simple one-gene locus controlling the onset of myopia, a complex interaction of many mutated proteins acting in concert may be the cause. Instead of myopia being caused by a defect in a structural protein, defects in the control of these structural proteins might be the actual cause of myopia. A collaboration of all myopia studies worldwide identified 16 new loci for refractive error in individuals of European ancestry, of which 8 were shared with Asians. The new loci include candidate genes with functions in neurotransmission, ion transport, retinoic acid metabolism, extracellular matrix remodeling and eye development. The carriers of the high-risk genes have a tenfold increased risk of myopia. Aberrant genetic recombination and gene splicing in the OPNLW1 and OPNMW1 genes that code for two retinal cone photopigment proteins can produce high myopia by interfering with refractive development of the eye.

Human population studies suggest that contribution of genetic factors accounts for 60–90% of variance in refraction. However, the currently identified variants account for only a small fraction of myopia cases, suggesting the existence of a large number of yet unidentified low-frequency or small-effect variants, which underlie the majority of myopia cases.

=== Environmental factors ===
Environmental factors that increase the risk of myopia include insufficient light exposure, low physical activity, near work, and increased years of education.

One hypothesis is that a lack of normal visual stimuli causes improper development of the eyeball. Under this hypothesis, "normal" refers to the environmental stimuli that the eyeball evolved to. Modern humans who spend most of their time indoors, in dimly or fluorescently lit buildings may be at risk of development of myopia.

People, and children especially, who spend more time doing physical exercise and outdoor play, have lower rates of myopia, suggesting the increased magnitude and complexity of the visual stimuli encountered during these types of activities decrease myopic progression. There is preliminary evidence that the protective effect of outdoor activities on the development of myopia is due, at least in part, to the effect of long hours of exposure to daylight on the production and the release of retinal dopamine.

Myopia can be induced with minus spherical lenses, and overminus in prescription lenses can induce myopia progression. Overminus during refraction can be avoided through various techniques and tests, such as fogging, plus to blur, and the duochrome test.

The near work hypothesis, also referred to as the "use-abuse theory", states that spending time involved in near work strains the intraocular and extraocular muscles. Some studies support the hypothesis, while other studies do not. While an association is present, it is not clearly causal.

Myopia is also more common in children with diabetes, childhood arthritis, uveitis, and systemic lupus erythematosus.

=== Other factors ===
Research indicates a relationship between body mass index (BMI) and myopia, with both low and high BMI associated with an increased risk of developing myopia. A nationwide study of 1.3 million Israeli adolescents found that individuals with underweight status had higher chances of mild-to-moderate and high myopia compared to those with low-normal BMI. Similarly, a study involving Korean young adult men reported that those who were of average or shorter height and lean had a higher prevalence of high myopia.

== Mechanism ==
Video explaining the development of axial myopia (NIH)

Because myopia is a refractive error, the physical cause of myopia is comparable to any optical system that is out of focus. Borish and Duke-Elder classified myopia by these physical causes:

- Axial myopia is attributed to an increase in the eye's axial length.
- Refractive myopia is attributed to the condition of the refractive elements of the eye. Borish further subclassified refractive myopia:
  - Curvature myopia is attributed to excessive, or increased, curvature of one or more of the refractive surfaces of the eye, especially the cornea. In those with Cohen syndrome, myopia appears to result from high corneal and lenticular power.
  - Index myopia is attributed to variation in the index of refraction of one or more of the ocular media.

As with any optical system experiencing a defocus aberration, the effect can be exaggerated or masked by changing the aperture size. In the case of the eye, a large pupil emphasizes refractive error and a small pupil masks it. This phenomenon can cause a condition in which an individual has a greater difficulty seeing in low-illumination areas, even though there are no symptoms in bright light, such as daylight.

Under rare conditions, edema of the ciliary body can cause an anterior displacement of the lens, inducing a myopia shift in refractive error.

== Diagnosis ==
A diagnosis of myopia is typically made by an eye care professional, usually an optometrist or ophthalmologist. An eye examination is performed, typically using an eye chart.

=== Types ===
Myopia can be classified into two major types; anatomical and clinical. The types of myopia based on anatomical features are axial, curvature, index and displacement of refractive element. Congenital, simple and pathological myopia are the clinical types of myopia.

Various forms of myopia have been described by their clinical appearance:

- Simple myopia: Myopia in an otherwise normal eye, typically less than 4.00 to 6.00 diopters. This is the most common form of myopia.
- Degenerative myopia, also known as malignant, pathological, or progressive myopia, is characterized by marked fundus changes, such as posterior staphyloma, and associated with a high refractive error and subnormal visual acuity after correction. This form of myopia gets progressively worse over time. Degenerative myopia has been reported as one of the main causes of visual impairment.
- Pseudomyopia is the blurring of distance vision brought about by spasm of the accommodation system.
- Nocturnal myopia: Without adequate stimulus for accurate accommodation, the accommodation system partially engages, pushing distance objects out of focus.
- Nearwork-induced transient myopia (NITM): short-term myopic far point shift immediately following a sustained near visual task. Some authors argue for a link between NITM and the development of permanent myopia.
- Instrument myopia: over-accommodation when looking into an instrument such as a microscope.
- Induced myopia, also known as acquired myopia, sometimes reversible myopic shift, results from various medications, increases in glucose levels, nuclear sclerosis, oxygen toxicity (e.g., from underwater diving or from oxygen and hyperbaric therapy) or other anomalous conditions. Sulphonamide therapy can cause ciliary body edema, resulting in anterior displacement of the lens, pushing the eye out of focus. Elevation of blood-glucose levels can also cause edema (swelling) of the crystalline lens as a result of sorbitol accumulating in the lens. This edema often causes temporary myopia. Scleral buckles, used in the repair of retinal detachments may induce myopia by increasing the axial length of the eye.
- Index myopia is attributed to variation in the index of refraction of one or more of the ocular media. Cataracts may lead to index myopia.
- Form deprivation myopia occurs when the eyesight is deprived by limited illumination and vision range, or the eye is modified with artificial lenses or deprived of clear form vision. In lower vertebrates, this kind of myopia seems to be reversible within short periods of time. Myopia is often induced this way in various animal models to study the pathogenesis and mechanism of myopia development.

=== Degree ===
The degree of myopia is described in terms of the power of the ideal correction, which is measured in diopters:

- Myopia between −0.00 and −0.50 diopters is usually classified as emmetropia.
- Low myopia usually describes myopia between −0.50 and −3.00 diopters.
- Moderate myopia usually describes myopia between −3.00 and −6.00 diopters. Those with moderate amounts of myopia are more likely to have pigment dispersion syndrome or pigmentary glaucoma.
- High myopia usually describes myopia of −6.00 or more. People with high myopia are more likely to have retinal detachments and primary open angle glaucoma. They are also more likely to experience floaters, shadow-like shapes which appear in the field of vision. In addition to this, high myopia is linked to macular degeneration, cataracts, and significant visual impairment.

The highest myopia ever recorded was −108 diopters by a Slovak, Jan Miskovic.

=== Age at onset ===
Myopia is sometimes classified by the age at onset:

- Congenital myopia, also known as infantile myopia, is present at birth and persists through infancy.
- Youth onset myopia occurs in early childhood or teenage, and the ocular power can keep varying until the age of 21, before which any form of corrective surgery is usually not recommended by ophthalmic specialists around the world.
- School myopia appears during childhood, particularly the school age years. This form of myopia is attributed to the use of the eyes for close work during the school years. A 2004–2015 Singapore–Sydney study of children of Chinese descent found that time spent on outdoor activities was a factor.
- Adult onset myopia

- Early adult onset myopia occurs between ages 20 and 40.
- Late adult onset myopia occurs after age 40.

== Prevention and control of progression ==
Outdoor time is the best method of preventing myopia, reducing the rate of myopia onset by about 50%. The next best options are low-dose atropine and repeated low-level red light therapy, which also reduce myopia rates by 50%, but are less cost effective than outdoor time. Atropine, repeated low-level red light, peripheral defocus glasses, and orthokeratology contact lenses all reduce myopia progression by about 50% among children who have already developed myopia. Repeated low-level red light has shown benefits in slowing adult myopia progression too, but more research needs to be done to determine its exact effectiveness. Near-work is associated with myopia progression, but its effect size and causality are undetermined. The best approach is to combine multiple prevention and control methods.

=== Spending time outdoors ===
Time spent outdoors is directly correlated with reduced rate of myopia, with good evidence of a causal association. Interventions to increase outdoor time in children are highly effective in preventing myopia, and 2 hours of outdoor time per day is recommended. In Taiwan, government policies that require schools to send all children outdoors for a minimum amount of time have driven down the prevalence of myopia in children.

=== Glasses and contacts ===
Altering the use of eyeglasses between full-time, part-time, and not at all does not appear to alter myopia progression. It is unclear whether bifocals and progressive lenses alter the progression of myopia, with some studies showing minor benefit, and others showing no effect.

In December 2025, the United States Food and Drug Administration approved a new type of lens to help nearsightedness in six to 12 year olds, based on data from the manufacturer Essilor showing that children experienced a 70% reduction in myopia progression after two years (compared to children wearing normal glasses). The lenses use 11 concentric rings full of raised dots to induce peripheral defocus.

=== Medication ===
Anti-muscarinic topical medications in children under 18 years old are effective in slowing the progression of myopia. The usual treatment is atropine eye drops. Other medications such as pirenzepine gel and cyclopentolate eye drops may be used instead, but the evidence for their effectiveness is less strong. Side effects can include light sensitivity and blurred vision, but the treatment is generally well-tolerated.

=== Other methods ===
Scleral reinforcement surgery is aimed to cover the thinning posterior pole with a supportive material to withstand intraocular pressure and prevent further progression of the posterior staphyloma. The strain is reduced, although damage from the pathological process cannot be reversed. By stopping the progression of the disease, vision may be maintained or improved. The use of orthoK can also slow down axial lens elongation.

== Treatment ==
Compensating for myopia using a corrective lens

There is no universally accepted method of preventing myopia and proposed methods need additional study to determine their effectiveness. Optical correction using glasses or contact lenses is the most common treatment; other approaches include orthokeratology, and refractive surgery.

=== Glasses and contacts ===
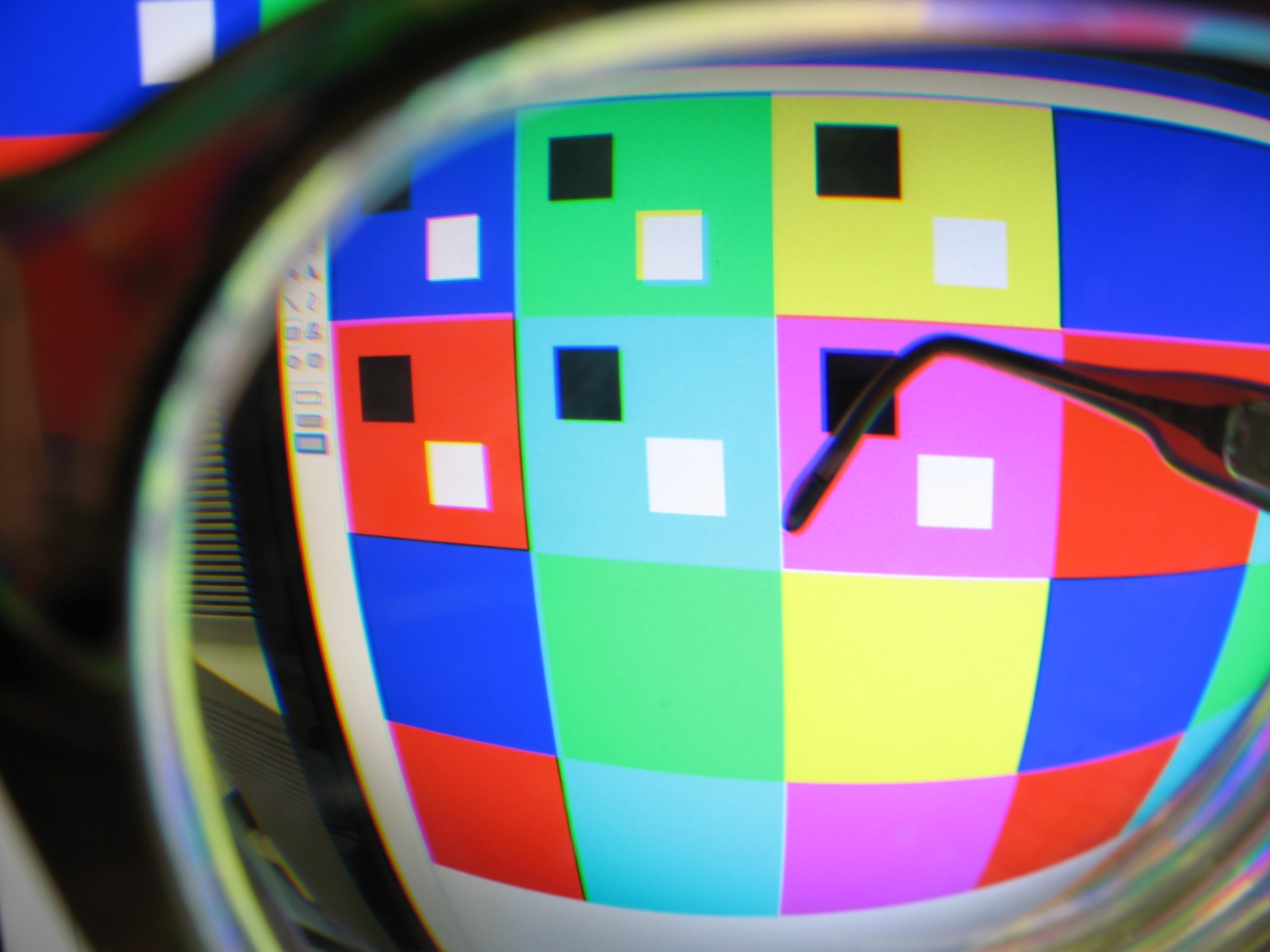
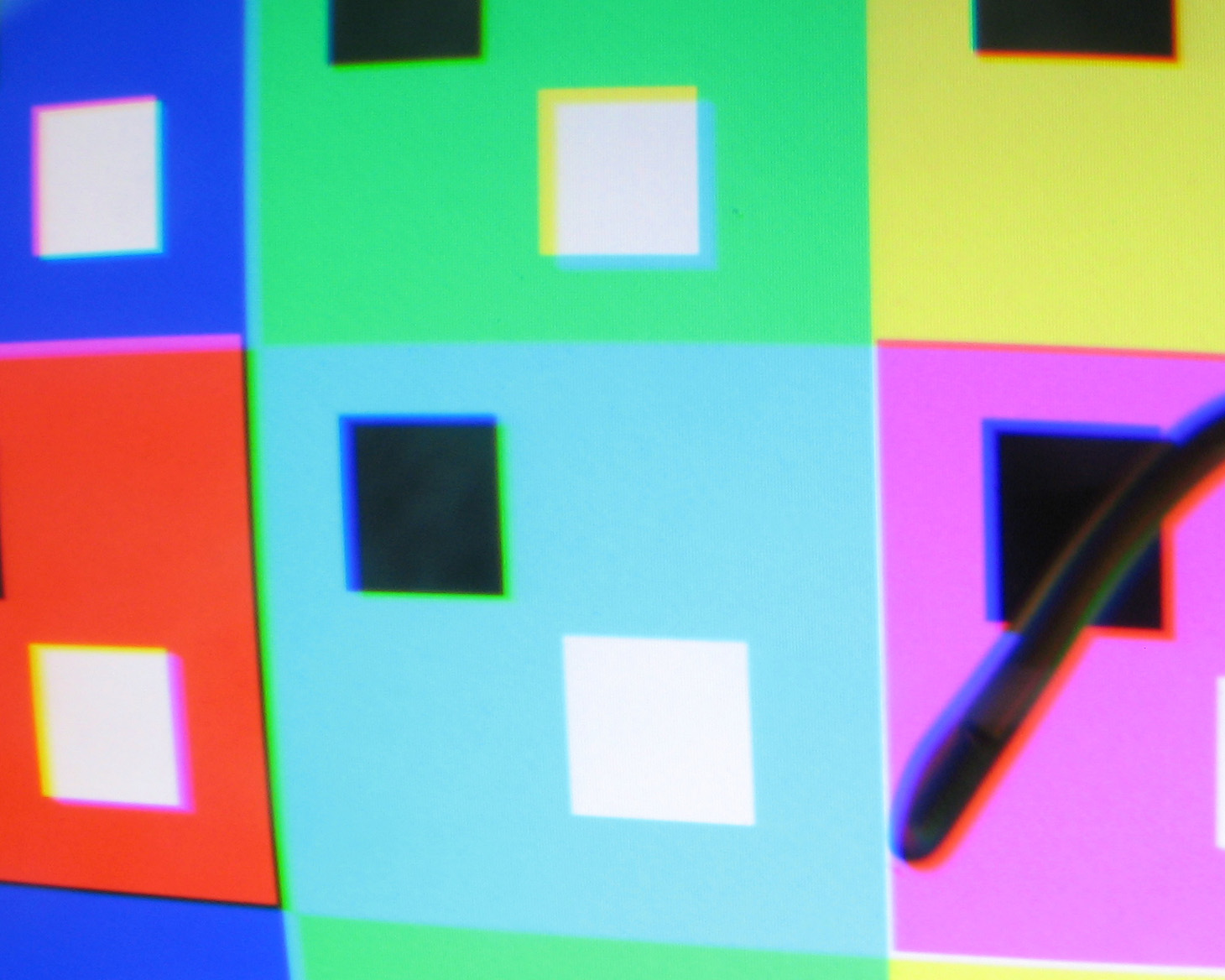
Prismatic color distortion shown with a camera set for near-sighted focus, and using −9.5 diopter eyeglasses to correct the camera's myopia (left). Close-up of color shifting through corner of eyeglasses. The light and dark borders visible between color swatches do not exist (right).

Corrective lenses bend the light entering the eye in a way that places a focused image accurately onto the retina. The power of any lens system can be expressed in diopters, the reciprocal of its focal length in meters. Corrective lenses for myopia have negative powers because a divergent lens is required to move the far point of focus out to the distance. More severe myopia needs lens powers further from zero (more negative). However, strong eyeglass prescriptions create distortions such as prismatic movement and chromatic aberration. Strongly myopic wearers of contact lenses do not experience these distortions because the lens moves with the cornea, keeping the optic axis in line with the visual axis and because the vertex distance has been reduced to zero.

=== Surgery ===
Refractive surgery includes procedures which alter the corneal curvature of some structure of the eye or which add additional refractive means inside the eye.

==== Photorefractive keratectomy ====
Photorefractive keratectomy (PRK) involves ablation of corneal tissue from the corneal surface using an excimer laser. The amount of tissue ablation corresponds to the amount of myopia. While PRK is a relatively safe procedure for up to 6 dioptres of myopia, the recovery phase post-surgery is usually painful.

==== LASIK ====
In a LASIK pre-procedure, a corneal flap is cut into the cornea and lifted to allow the excimer laser beam access to the exposed corneal tissue. After that, the excimer laser ablates the tissue according to the required correction. When the flap again covers the cornea, the change in curvature generated by the laser ablation proceeds to the corneal surface. Though LASIK is usually painless and involves a short rehabilitation period post-surgery, it can potentially result in flap complications and loss of corneal stability (post-LASIK keratectasia).

==== Phakic intraocular lens ====
Instead of modifying the corneal surface, as in laser vision correction (LVC), this procedure involves implanting an additional lens inside the eye (in addition to the already existing natural lens). While it usually results in good control of the refractive change, it can induce potential serious long-term complications such as glaucoma, cataract and endothelial decompensation.

=== Orthokeratology ===
Orthokeratology or simply Ortho-K is a temporary corneal reshaping process using rigid gas permeable (RGP) contact lenses. Overnight wearing of specially designed contact lenses will temporarily reshape cornea, so patients may see clearly without any lenses in daytime. Orthokeratology can correct myopia up to −6D. Several studies shown that Ortho-K can reduce myopia progression also. Risk factors of using Ortho-K lenses include microbial keratitis, corneal edema, etc. Other contact lens related complications such as corneal aberration, photophobia, pain, irritation, redness etc. are usually temporary conditions, which may be eliminated by proper usage of lenses.

=== Intrastromal corneal ring segment ===
The Intrastromal corneal ring segment (ICRS), commonly used in keratoconus treatment now, was originally designed to correct mild to moderate myopia. The thickness is directly related to flattening and the diameter of the ring is proportionally inverse to the flattening of cornea. So, if diameter is smaller or thickness is greater, resulting myopia correction will be greater.

=== Alternative medicine ===
A number of alternative therapies have been claimed to improve myopia, including vision therapy, "behavioural optometry", various eye exercises and relaxation techniques, and the Bates method. Scientific reviews have concluded that there was "no clear scientific evidence" that eye exercises are effective in treating myopia and as such they "cannot be advocated".

== Epidemiology ==
Global refractive errors have been estimated to affect 800 million to 2.3 billion. The incidence of myopia within sampled population often varies with age, country, sex, race, ethnicity, occupation, environment, and other factors. Variability in testing and data collection methods makes comparisons of prevalence and progression difficult.

The prevalence of myopia has been reported as high as 70–90% in some Asian countries, 30–40% in Europe and the United States, and 10–20% in Africa. Myopia is about twice as common in Jewish people than in people of non-Jewish ethnicity. Myopia is less common in African people and associated diaspora. In Americans between the ages of 12 and 54, myopia has been found to affect African Americans less than Caucasians.

A 2024 study published in the British Journal of Ophthalmology revealed that more than one-third of children worldwide were nearsighted in 2023, with this figure projected to rise to nearly 40% by 2050. The prevalence of myopia among children and adolescents has increased significantly over the past 30 years, rising from 24% in 1990 to almost 36% in 2023, with researchers noting a sharp spike in cases following the COVID-19 pandemic and highlighting regional differences in myopia rates.

A 2025 South Korean analysis of 45 studies, involving 335,524 participants and largely based on data from children, adolescents and young adults, that looked at the use of digital screen devices such as mobile phones, game consoles and television, revealed that an additional hour of daily screen time is, on average, associated with 21% higher odds of having myopia.

=== Asia ===
Estimated myopia rate in 20-year-olds in Asia

In some parts of Asia, myopia is very common.

- South Korea is believed to have the highest prevalence of myopia in the world; up to 93% of people there have myopia.
- China's myopia rate is 80% by high school.
- In some areas, such as China and Malaysia, up to 41% of the adult population is myopic to 1.00 dpt, and up to 80% to 0.5 dpt.
- A study of Jordanian adults aged 17 to 40 found more than half (54%) were myopic.
- A study indicated that the prevalence of myopia among urban children in India of aged 5 to 15 increased from 4.44% in 1999 to 21.15% in 2019. Projections suggest that by 2050, this figure could reach 48.14%.
- Some research suggests the prevalence of myopia in Indian children is less than 15%.
- Up to 90% of young people in Taiwan have myopia.

=== Europe ===
Myopia rate in Europe by birth decade (1910 to 1970)

- In first-year undergraduate students in the United Kingdom 50% of British whites and 53% of British Asians were myopic.
- A recent review found 27% of Western Europeans aged 40 or older have at least −1.00 diopters of myopia and 5% have at least −5.00 diopters.

=== North America ===
Myopia is common in the United States, with research suggesting this condition has increased dramatically in recent decades. In 1971–1972, the National Health and Nutrition Examination Survey provided the earliest nationally representative estimates for myopia prevalence in the U.S., and found the prevalence in persons aged 12–54 was 25%. Using the same method, in 1999–2004, myopia prevalence was estimated to have climbed to 42%.

A study of 2,523 children in grades 1 to 8 (age, 5–17 years) found nearly one in 10 (9%) have at least −0.75 diopters of myopia. In this study, 13% had at least +1.25 D hyperopia (farsightedness), and 28% had at least 1.00-D difference between the two principal meridians (cycloplegic autorefraction) of astigmatism. For myopia, Asians had the highest prevalence (19%), followed by Hispanics (13%). Caucasian children had the lowest prevalence of myopia (4%), which was not significantly different from African Americans (7%).

A recent review found 25% of Americans aged 40 or older have at least −1.00 diopters of myopia and 5% have at least −5.00 diopters.

=== Australia ===
In Australia, the overall prevalence of myopia (worse than −0.50 diopters) has been estimated to be 17%. In one recent study, less than one in 10 (8%) Australian children between the ages of four and 12 were found to have myopia greater than −0.50 diopters. A recent review found 16% of Australians aged 40 or older have at least −1.00 diopters of myopia and 3% have at least −5.00 diopters.

=== South America ===
In Brazil, a 2005 study estimated 6% of Brazilians between the ages of 12 and 59 had −1.00 diopter of myopia or more, compared with 3% of the indigenous people in northwestern Brazil. Another found nearly 1 in 8 (13%) of the students in the city of Natal were myopic.

== History ==
The difference between the near-sighted and far-sighted people was noted already by Aristotle. Graeco-Roman physician Galen first used the term "myopia" (from Greek words "myein" meaning "to close or shut" and "ops" meaning "eye") for nearsightedness. The first spectacles for correcting myopia were invented by a German cardinal in the year 1451. Johannes Kepler in his Clarification of Ophthalmic Dioptrics (1604) first demonstrated that myopia was due to the incident light focusing in front of the retina. Kepler also showed that myopia could be corrected by concave lenses. In 1632, Vopiscus Fortunatus Plempius examined a myopic eye and confirmed that myopia was due to a lengthening of its axial diameter.

The idea that myopia was caused by the eye strain involved in reading or doing other work close to the eyes was a consistent theme for several centuries. In Taiwan, faced with a staggering rise in the number of young military recruits needing glasses, the schools were told to give students' eyes a 10-minute break after every half-hour of reading; however, the rate of myopia continued to climb. The policy that reversed the epidemic of myopia was the government ordering all schools to have the children outside for a minimum of 80 minutes every day.

== Society and culture ==
The terms "myopia" and "myopic" (or the common terms "short-sightedness" or "short-sighted", respectively) have been used metaphorically to refer to cognitive thinking and decision making that is narrow in scope or lacking in foresight or in concern for wider interests or for longer-term consequences. It is often used to describe a decision that may be beneficial in the present, but detrimental in the future, or a viewpoint that fails to consider anything outside a very narrow and limited range. Hyperopia, the biological opposite of myopia, may also be used metaphorically for a value system or motivation that exhibits "farsighted" or possibly visionary thinking and behavior; that is, emphasizing long-term interests at the apparent expense of near-term benefit.

Keeping children indoors, whether to promote early academic activities, because urban development choices leave no place for children to play outside, or because people avoid sunlight because of a preference for lighter skin color, causes myopia. Taiwan has developed an aggressive program to identify pre-school-age children with pre-myopia and treat them with atropine, and to have schools send students outdoors every day. The Tian-tian 120 program ("Every day 120") encourages 120 minutes of outdoor time each day. Compared to the cost of lifelong treatment for myopia with glasses, and in some cases, preventable blindness, the US$13 spent on screening young children for pre-myopia is considered a good investment in public health.

=== Correlations ===
Numerous studies have found correlations between myopia and intelligence and academic achievement; it is not clear whether there is a causal relationship. Myopia is also correlated with increased microsaccade amplitude, suggesting that blurred vision from myopia might cause instability in fixational eye movements.

== See also ==
- Myopia in animals
- Myopic crescent
- Instrument myopia
