= Lensmeter =

Ophthalmic instrument mainly used by optometrists and opticians

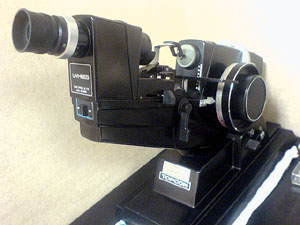
A lensmeter in an optical shop

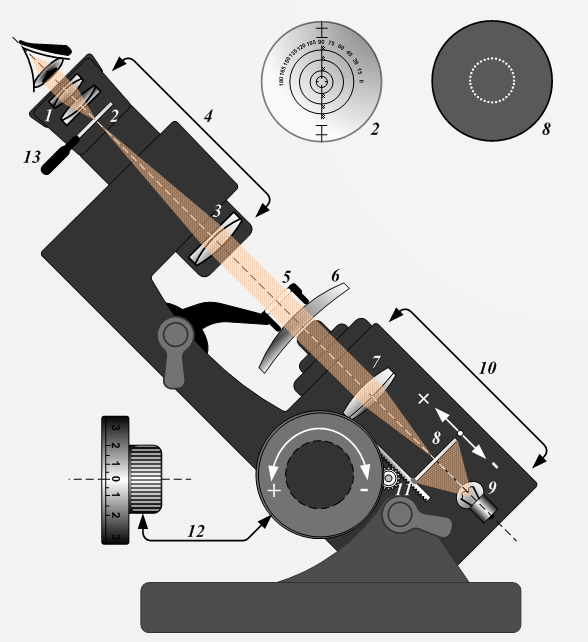
A simple lensmeter cross sectional view. 1 – Adjustable eyepiece 2 – Reticle 3 – Objective lens 4 – Keplerian telescope 5 – Lens holder 6 – Unknown lens 7 – Standard lens 8 – Illuminated target 9 – Light source 10 – Collimator 11 – Angle adjustment lever 12 – Power drum (+20 and -20 diopters) 13 – Prism scale knob

A lensmeter or lensometer (sometimes even known as focimeter or vertometer) is an optical instrument used in ophthalmology. It is mainly used by optometrists and opticians to measure the back or front vertex power of a spectacle lens and verify the correct prescription in a pair of eyeglasses, to properly orient and mark uncut lenses, and to confirm the correct mounting of lenses in spectacle frames. Lensmeters can also verify the power of contact lenses if a special lens support is used.

The parameters appraised by a lensmeter are the values specified by an ophthalmologist or optometrist on the patient's prescription: sphere, cylinder, axis, add, and in some cases, prism. The lensmeter is also used to check the accuracy of progressive lenses, and is often capable of marking the lens center and various other measurements critical to proper performance of the lens. It may also be used prior to an eye examination to obtain the last prescription the patient was given, in order to expedite the subsequent examination.

== History ==
In 1848, Antoine Claudet produced the photographometer, an instrument designed to measure the intensity of photogenic rays; and in 1849 he brought out the focimeter, for securing a perfect focus in photographic portraiture. In 1876, Hermann Snellen introduced a phakometer which was a similar set up to an optical bench which could measure the power and find the optical centre of a convex lens. Troppman went a step further in 1912, introducing the first direct measuring instrument.

In 1922, a patent was filed for the first projection lensmeter, which has a similar system to the standard lensmeter, but projects the measuring target onto a screen eliminating the need for correction of the observer's refractive error in the instrument itself and reducing the requirement to peer down a small telescope into the instrument.

== See also ==
- Lens clock
- Optical power
- Diopter
- Focometer
- Prism dioptre
- Corrective lens components
- Abbe refractometer
