= MFG in Minnesota =

Live album by Joe McPhee, Milo Fine and Steve Gnitka
- Released: 1979
- Recorded: June 4, 1978 at the Walker Church
- Genre: Jazz
- Label: HatHut hat HUT S/T
- Producer: Pia & Werner X. Uehlinger

Joe McPhee chronology
Glasses (1977)	MFG in Minnesota (1979)	Old Eyes (1980)

MFG in Minnesota is a live album by multi-instrumentalist and composer Joe McPhee, recorded in 1978 and first released on the Swiss HatHut label in 1979.

== Reception ==
Professional ratings
Review scores
Source	Rating
Allmusic	2/5 stars

Allmusic gave the album 2 stars stating "One of the dangers in such associations when dealing with a musician of McPhee's caliber, however, is that his companions won't quite measure up, which is often the case here. The effort is certainly there and the results aren't "bad" by any means, but there is a certain lackluster quality where one gets the sense that any forward progress is being provided by McPhee, with the others straining to keep up".

== Track listing ==
All compositions by Joe McPhee, Milo Fine and Steve Gnitka

1. "Part IB" - 17:05
2. "Part IC" - 8:39
3. "Part IIA" - 5:54
4. "Part IIB" - 18:14
5. "Part IIC" - 11:03
6. "Part IID" - 5:52

== Personnel ==
- Joe McPhee - tenor saxophone, soprano saxophone, pocket cornet
- Milo Fine - piano, prepared piano, clavinet, drums
- Steve Gnitka - guitar
