= BCOR =

BCOR may refer to:

- Back central optic radius
- BCL-6 corepressor
