= Progressive lens =

Corrective lens used in eyeglasses

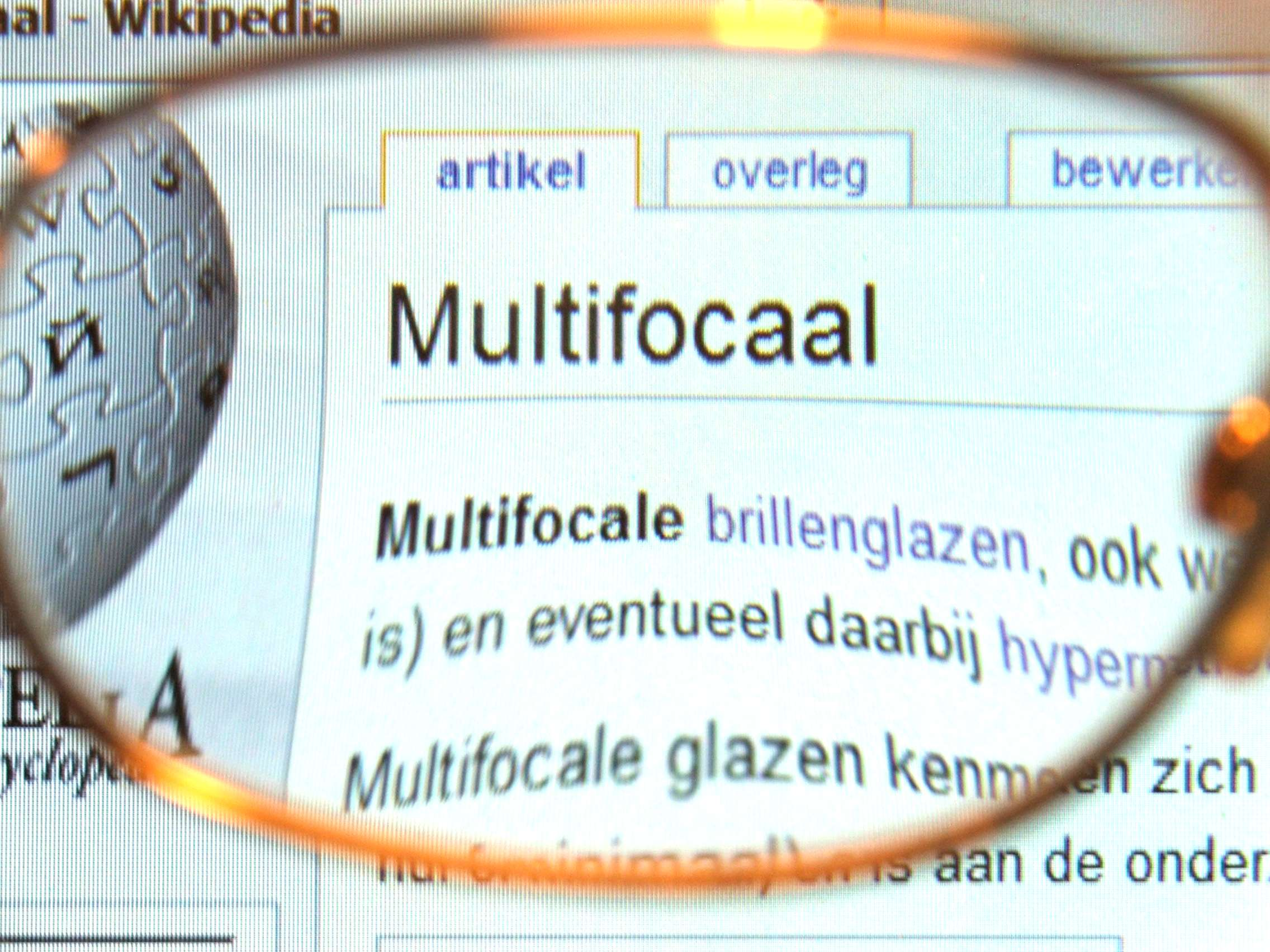
View through a progressive lens at some distance. In normal use, a much smaller section of the lens is used, so that the distortion is much smaller.

Progressive lenses are corrective lenses used in eyeglasses to correct presbyopia and other disorders of accommodation. They are characterised by a gradient of increasing lens power, added to the wearer's correction for the other refractive errors. The gradient starts at the wearer's distance prescription at the top of the lens and reaches a maximum addition power, or the full reading addition, at the bottom of the lens. The length of the progressive power gradient on the lens surface depends on the design of the lens, with a final addition power between 0.75 and 3.50 dioptres. The addition value prescribed depends on the level of presbyopia of the patient. In general the older the patient, the higher the addition. They are also known as multifocal lenses, progressive addition lenses (PAL), varifocal lenses, progressive power lenses, graduated prescription lenses, or progressive spectacle lenses.

== History ==
The first patent for a PAL was British Patent 15,735, granted to Owen Aves with a 1907 priority date. This patent included the manufacturing process and design which was however never commercialized. Unlike modern PALs, it consisted of a conical back surface and a cylindrical front with opposing axis in order to create a power progression.

While there were several intermediate steps (H. Newbold appears to have designed a similar lens to Aves around 1913), there is evidence to suggest that Duke Elder in 1922 developed the world's first commercially available PAL (Ultrifo) sold by "Gowlland of Montreal". This was based on an arrangement of aspherical surfaces.

The Carl Zeiss AG & Varilux lenses were the first PAL of modern design. Bernard Maitenaz, patented Varilux in 1953, and the product was introduced in 1959 by Société des Lunetiers (now Essilor). The first Varilux lenses' surface structure was however still close to a bifocal lens, with an upper, aberration-free half of the surface for far vision and a rather large "segment" for clear near vision. The breakthrough in user adaptation and comfort, as well as peripheral and dynamic vision however occurred in 1972 with the introduction of Varilux 2, for which Maitenaz created a totally aspheric design and manufacturing process. Carl Zeiss AG developed freeform technology in 1983 with its own patented progressive series Gradal HS.

Early progressive lenses were relatively crude designs. Right and left were identical variable power lenses with distance and reading power centers in the upper and lower part of the lens, respectively. The glazing was made to accommodate eye position changes from distance viewing to reading. The point of reading is about 14 mm below and 2 mm to the nasal side in comparison to distance viewing. By tilting the reading power towards the nasal side in perfect symmetry, appropriate reading power was given to the wearer.

The symmetric design, however, was difficult to accept for patients, because the eyes in general work asymmetrically. When you look to your right, your right eye views distal (i.e. looking through the lens near to the arm of the spectacles) while your left eye views nasal (i.e. looking through the lens near to the bridge). Modern sophisticated progressive lenses are designed asymmetrically for greater patient acceptance and include special designs to cater to many separate types of wearer application: for example progressive addition lenses may be designed with distance to intermediate or intermediate to near prescriptions specifically for use as an occupational lens, or to offer enlarged near and intermediate view areas.

The typical progressive lens is produced from a so-called semi-finished lens. The semi-finished lens is molded with an asymmetrical power pattern on the front. On the back side a custom surfacing is made to adjust the power for each patient. This method is however problematic, especially for astigmatic prescriptions. The reason being that the semi-finished front pattern is designed for a spherical prescription. Freeform designs are tailored to each prescription and do not have this problem.

Since the 1980s, manufacturers have been able to minimize unwanted aberrations by:

- improvements in mathematical modeling of surfaces, allowing greater design control;
- extensive wearer trials; and
- improved lens manufacturing and measurement technology.

Today the complex surfaces of a progressive lens can be cut and polished on computer-controlled machines, allowing 'freeform surfacing', as opposed to the earlier casting process, thus explaining the difference in price. In short, the price is based on the technology used and the year the lens came to market.

== Advantages and use ==
- Compared to single vision lenses, progressive lenses provide the correction required for a presbyopic patient to see clearly at all viewing distances, typically adjusted by tilting the head slightly — or else by moving the object that is being viewed.
- Progressive addition lenses avoid the discontinuities (image-jumps) sometimes found with bifocal and trifocal lenses
- Some people find them more cosmetically attractive. Because bifocals and related designs are associated with old age, proponents have suggested the lack of visible lines makes a progressive lens appear similar to the single vision lenses worn before the onset of presbyopia.

== Disadvantages ==
- Progressive lenses suffer regions of aberrations and geometric distortions in the periphery, leading to poor vision when turning the eyes down and to the sides. Different designs of progressive lenses have varying degrees of this distortion.
- Progressive lenses require careful placement relative to the wearer's pupil centre for a distance-viewing reference position. Incorrect specification of the fitting location can cause problems for the wearer including (depending on the design of the lens) narrow fields of view, clear vision in one eye only, and on-axis blur.
- Progressive lenses are more expensive than bifocals and single-vision lenses due to higher manufacturing and fitting costs. Some research has been conducted to reduce the fabrication cost by precision injection molding.

When recommending a progressive lens design, an eyecare practitioner will usually ask the customer some questions about their lifestyle, which coupled with prescription restrictions or recommendations and cost can establish the suitability of various models of progressive lens. Different lenses have different glazing restrictions, lens material availabilities, maximum and minimum fitting heights, and prescription ranges; as such, the variation in quality between higher and lower end varifocal lenses is considerable.

== Adaptation ==
For those new to progressive lenses, an accommodation period is often required because the brain needs to learn to adapt to them. This period varies from a few hours for some individuals up to around two weeks. During this period, side effects can include headache and dizziness. It is advised that, when these symptoms set in, the progressive lenses be removed for a short period and replaced after symptoms have subsided. Returning to an older prescription or different type of lens design (bifocal, trifocal) only serves to increase the adaptation period to the progressive lenses. Some wearers find the visual discomfort caused by these distortions outweigh the benefits of wearing PALs; this is known as progressive non-tolerance. However, manufacturers claim acceptance rates of 90%–98%. Depth perception and distance estimation can be influenced during the adaptation period.

== See also ==
- Multifocal contact lens – Lenses placed on the eye's surface
