= Prism correction =

Component of some eyeglass prescriptions

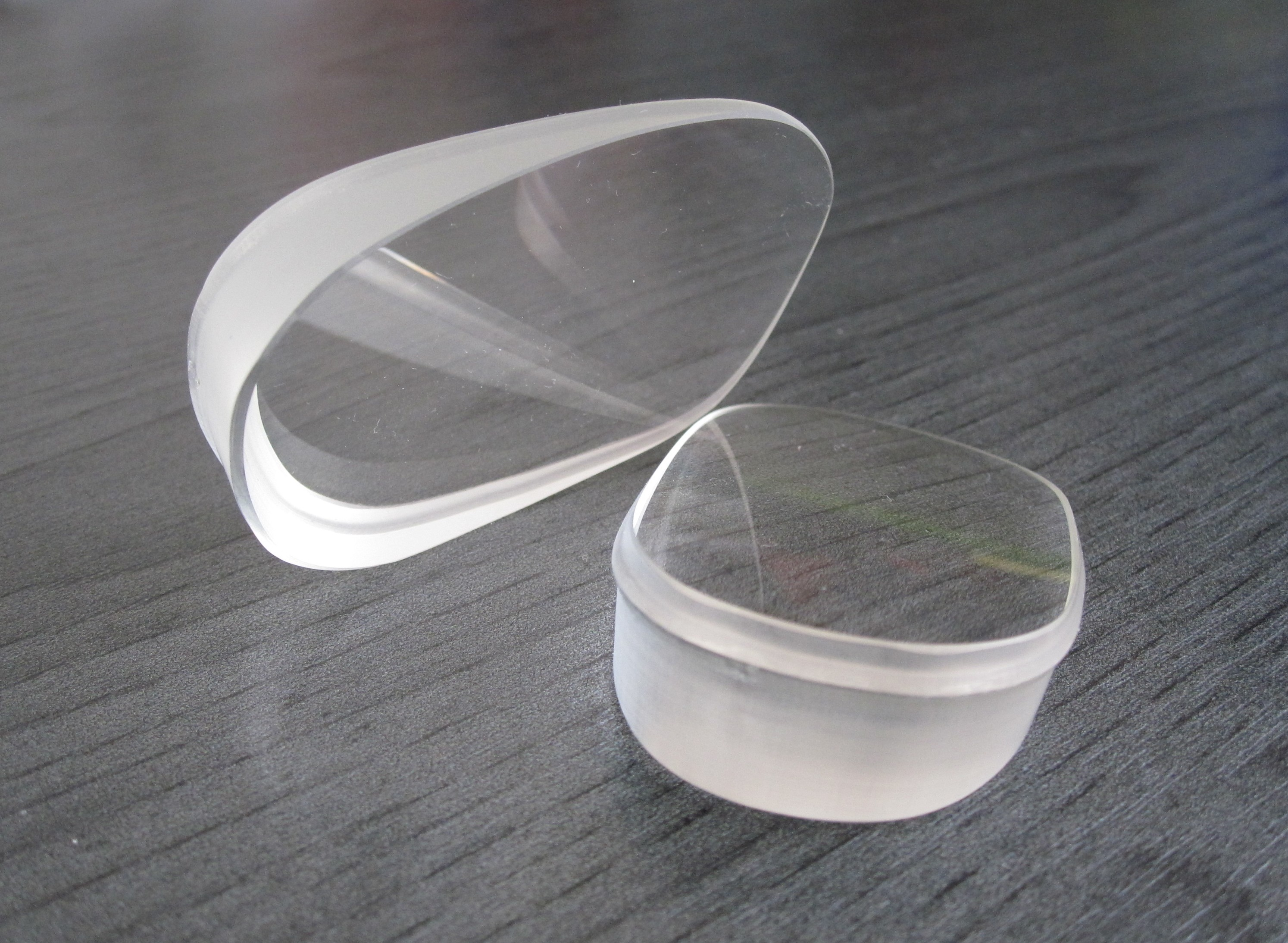
Prism lenses (here unusually thick) are used for pre-operative prism adaptation.

Eye care professionals use prism correction as a component of some eyeglass prescriptions. A lens which includes some amount of prism correction will displace the viewed image horizontally, vertically, or a combination of both directions. The most common application for this is the treatment of strabismus. By moving the image in front of the deviated eye, double vision can be avoided and comfortable binocular vision can be achieved. Other applications include yoked prism where the image is shifted an equal amount in each eye. This is useful when someone has a visual field defect on the same side of each eye. Individuals with nystagmus, Duane's retraction syndrome, 4th Nerve Palsy, and other eye movement disorders experience an improvement in their symptoms when they turn or tilt their head. Yoked prism can move the image away from primary gaze without the need for a constant head tilt or turn.

Prism correction is measured in prism dioptres (Commonwealth English) or prism diopters (U.S. English). A prescription that specifies prism correction will also specify the "base". The base is the thickest part of the lens and is opposite from the apex. Light will be bent towards the base and the image will be shifted towards the apex. In an eyeglass prescription, the base is typically specified as up, down, in, or out, but left and right are also used sometimes. Whether a patient needs this type of correction can be determined by a variety of methods.

== Prism dioptres ==
Prism correction is commonly specified in prism dioptres, a unit of angular measurement that is loosely related to the dioptre. Prism dioptres are represented by the Greek symbol delta (Δ) in superscript. A prism of power 1^{Δ} would produce 1 unit of displacement for an object held 100 units from the prism. Thus a prism of 1^{Δ} would produce 1 cm visible displacement at 100 cm, or 1 metre. This can be represented mathematically as:

$$P = 100\,\tan d\!$$

where $P$ is the amount of prism correction in prism dioptres, and $d$ is the angle of deviation of the light.

For a prism with apex angle $a$ and refractive index $n$,

$$d = (n-1)\,a$$.

== Prentice's rule ==
Prentice's rule, named so after the optician Charles F. Prentice, is a formula used to determine the amount of induced prism in a lens:

$$P = \frac{cf}{10}$$

where:

P is the amount of prism correction (in prism dioptres)
c is decentration (the distance between the pupil centre and the lens's optical centre, in millimetres)
f is lens power (in dioptres)

The primary use of Prentice's rule is that under certain circumstances, the prescribed prism can be obtained without grinding prism into the lenses, by decentering the lenses as worn by the patient.

An additional use of the rule is for determining the amount of unprescribed prism that is introduced if the lens is not correctly centred on the wearer's pupil. This can be used for tolerance control of lenses, for example when glasses must be made with lenses that are too small, so that the optical centre of one or both lenses must be displaced from the pupil position.

== See also ==
- Prentice position
