= Bifocals =

Eyeglasses with two distinct optical powers

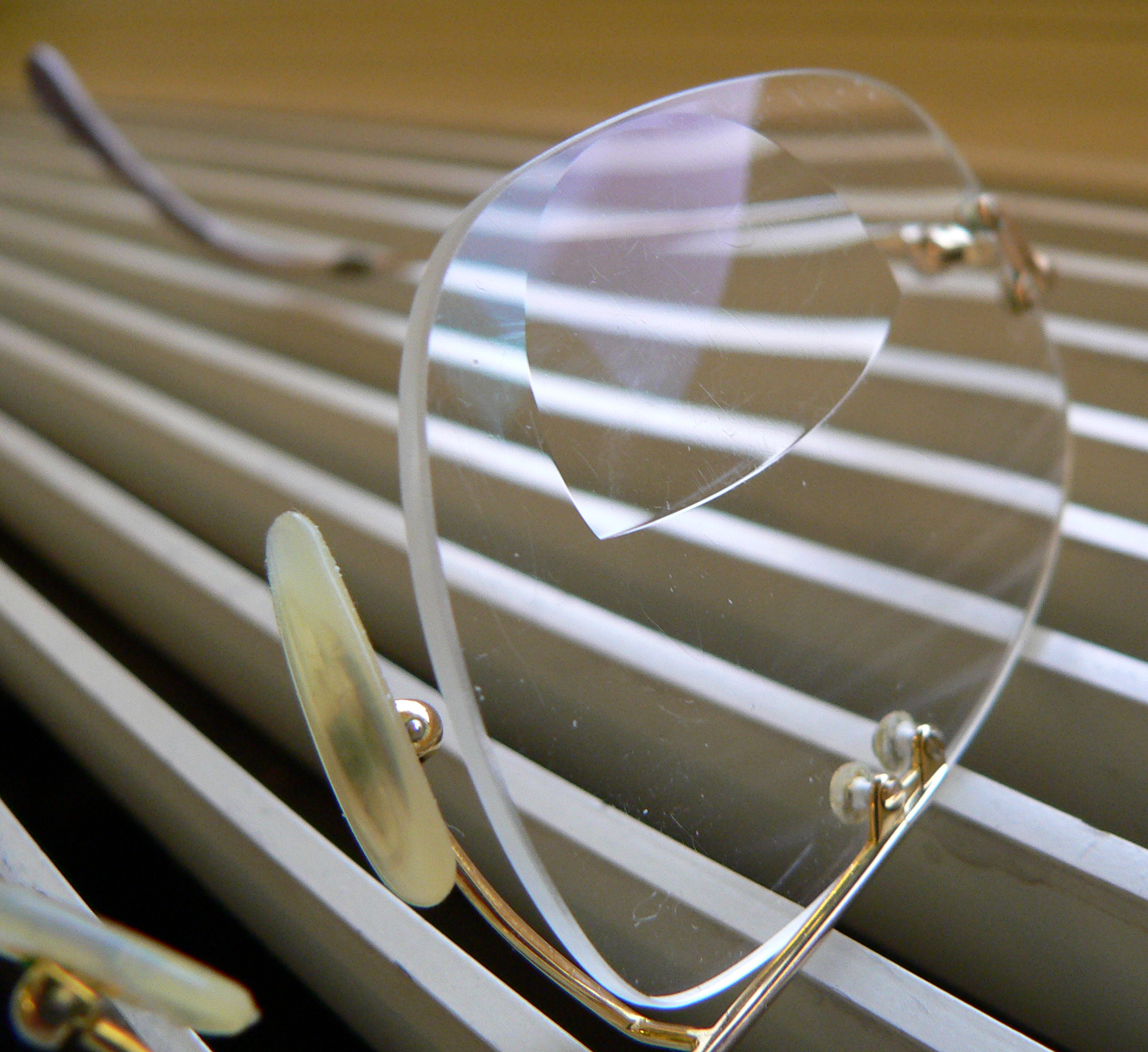
A bifocal lens with areas of differing magnification

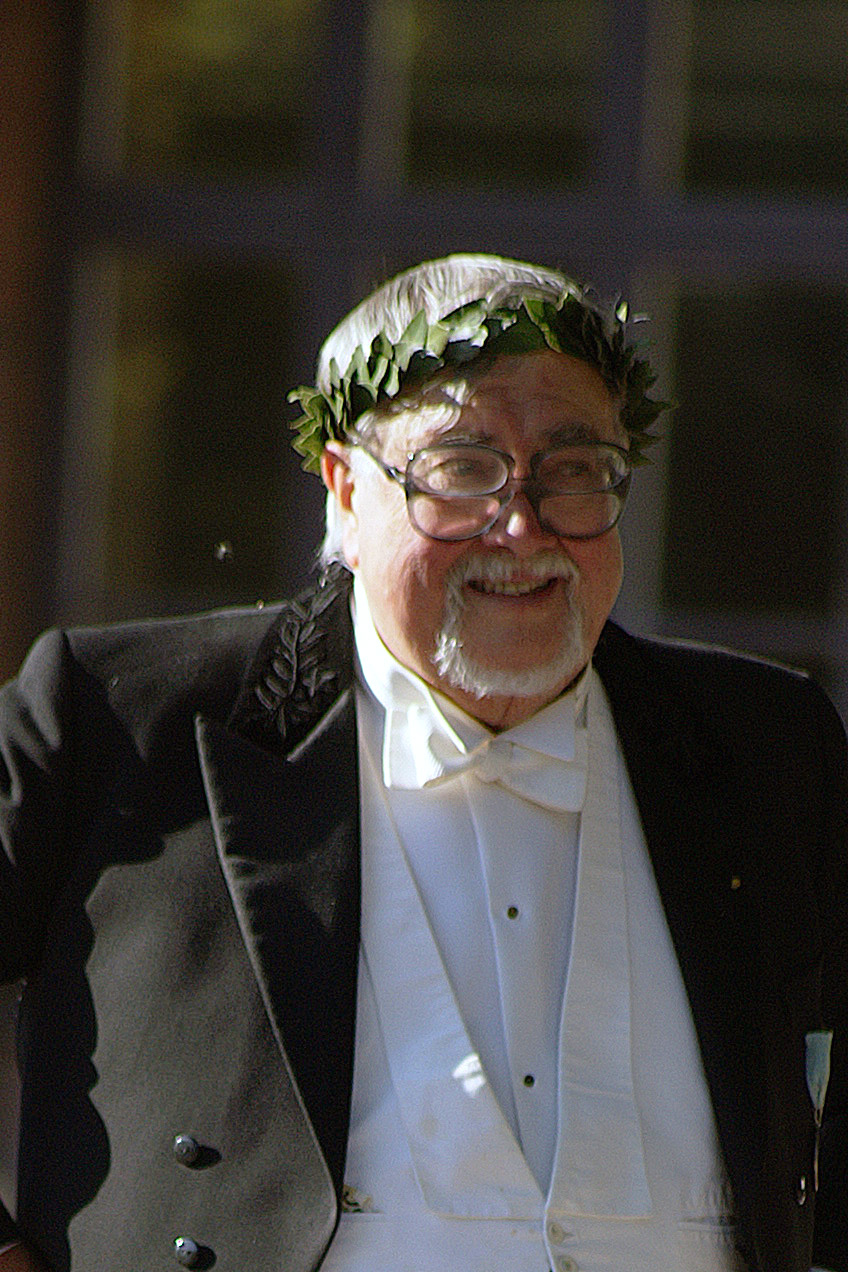
Bifocals with separate lenses. In this case, the Swedish ethnologist Jan-Öjvind Swahn.

Bifocals are eyeglasses with two distinct optical powers correcting vision at both long and short distances. Bifocals are commonly prescribed to people with presbyopia who also require a correction for myopia, hyperopia or astigmatism.

== History ==
Benjamin Franklin is generally credited with the invention of bifocals. One account states that Franklin cut his lenses in half so that he could follow speakers of French at court by reading their lips. Historians have produced some evidence to suggest that others may have come before him in the invention; however, a correspondence between George Whatley and John Fenno, editor of the Gazette of the United States, suggested that Franklin had indeed invented bifocals, and perhaps 50 years earlier than had been originally thought. However, the College of Optometrists concluded:

Unless further evidence emerges all we can say for certain is that Franklin was one of the first people to wear split bifocals and this act of wearing them caused his name to be associated with the type from an early date. This no doubt contributed greatly to their popularisation. The evidence implies, however, that when he sought to order lenses of this type the London opticians were already familiar with them. Other members of Franklin's circle of British friends may have worn them even earlier, from the 1760s, but it is at best uncertain (and arguably improbable?) that split bifocal lenses had a famous gentleman inventor. Since many inventions are developed independently by more than one person, it is possible that the invention of bifocals may have been such a case.

John Isaac Hawkins, the inventor of trifocal lenses, coined the term bifocals in 1824 and credited Benjamin Franklin.

In 1955, Irving Rips of Younger Optics developed the first commercially viable seamless or "invisible" bifocal”, a precursor to progressive lenses. This followed Howard D. Beach's 1946 work in "blended lenses", O'Conner's "Ultex" lens in 1910, and Isaac Schnaitmann's single-piece bifocal lens in 1837.

== Construction ==
Original bifocals were designed with the most convex lenses (for close viewing) in the lower half of the frame and the least convex lenses on the upper. Up until the beginning of the 20th century two separate lenses were cut in half and combined in the rim of the frame. The mounting of two half-lenses into a single frame led to a number of early complications and rendered such spectacles quite fragile. A method for fusing the sections of the lenses together was developed by Louis de Wecker at the end of the 19th century and patented by John Louis Borsch Jr. (1873–1929) in 1908. In 1915, Henri (Henry) A. Courmettes (1884-1969), a French immigrant to the US, patented the "Flat Top" (or "D Segment") reading portion of the bifocal. The advantages were wide reading area, less prismatic effects and no image jump between distance and close viewing. This was first introduced in mass production by the Univis Lens Co. of Dayton, OH. in 1926. In 1935, Courmettes went on to patent the Tilted Bifocal Lens, in 1936, a method of grinding two prescriptions simultaneously on that Tilted Bifocal Lens, and in 1951, the Cataract Bifocal Lens.

Today most bifocals are created by moulding a reading segment into a primary lens and are available with the reading segments in a variety of shapes and sizes.

== Problems ==
Bifocals can contribute to falls and may cause headaches or even dizziness for some wearers. Adaptation to the small field of view offered by the reading segment of bifocals can take some time, as the user learns to move either the head or the reading material rather than the eyes. Computer monitors are generally placed directly in front of users and can lead to muscle fatigue due to the unusual straight and constant movement of the head. This trouble is mitigated by the use of monofocal lenses for computer use.

== Future ==
Research continues in an attempt to eliminate the limited field of vision in current bifocals. New materials and technologies may provide a method which can selectively adjust the optical power of a lens. Researchers have constructed such a lens using a liquid crystal layer applied between two glass substrates.

== Bifocals in the animal world ==
The aquatic larval stage of the diving beetle Thermonectus marmoratus has, in its principal eyes, two retinas and two distinct focal planes that are substantially separated (in the manner of bifocals) to switch their vision from up-close to distance, for easy and efficient capture of their prey, mostly mosquito larvae.

== See also ==
- Binocular vision
- Binocular rivalry
- Glasses
- Eyewear
- Lens

== Sources ==
- G. Li; et al. (April 2006). "Switchable electro-optic diffractive lens with high efficiency for ophthalmic applications". Proc. Natl. Acad. Sci. USA. 103 (16): 6100–6104. Bibcode:2006PNAS..103.6100L. doi:10.1073/pnas.0600850103. PMC 1458838. PMID 16597675.
