= Prentice position =

The Prentice position

The Prentice position is an orientation of a prism, used in optics, optometry and ophthalmology. In this position, named after the optician Charles F. Prentice, the prism is oriented such that light enters it at an angle of 90° to the first surface, so that the beam does not refract at that surface. All the deviation caused by the prism takes place at the exit surface.

In ophthalmology, glass prisms were classically calibrated for use in the Prentice position, while plastic prisms were calibrated for use in the frontal position.

== See also ==
- Prism correction
- Prentice's rule
