= Corrective lens =

Type of lens to improve visual perception

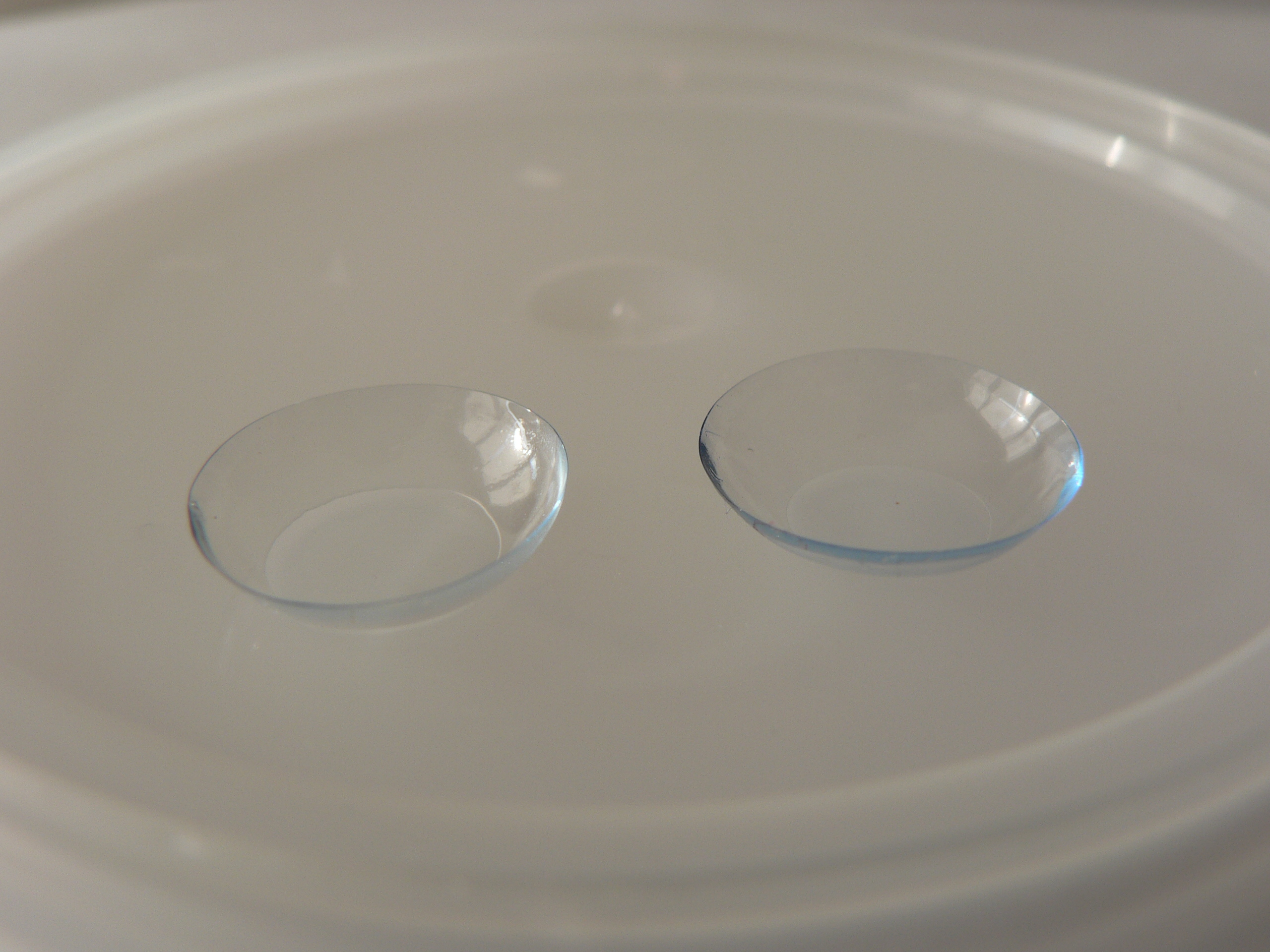
A pair of contact lenses, positioned with the concave side facing upward

A corrective lens is a transmissive optical device that is worn on the eye to improve visual perception. The most common use is to treat refractive errors: myopia, hypermetropia, astigmatism, and presbyopia. Glasses or "spectacles" are worn on the face a short distance in front of the eye. Contact lenses are worn directly on the surface of the eye. Intraocular lenses are surgically implanted most commonly after cataract removal but can be used for purely refractive purposes.

== Prescription of corrective lenses ==
Corrective lenses are typically prescribed by an ophthalmologist or an optometrist. The prescription consists of all the specifications necessary to make the lens. Prescriptions typically include the power specifications of each lens (for each eye). Strengths are generally prescribed in quarter-diopter steps (0.25 D), because most people cannot generally distinguish between smaller increments (e.g., eighth-diopter steps / 0.125 D). The use of improper corrective lenses may not be helpful and can even exacerbate binocular vision disorders. Eyecare professionals (optometrists and ophthalmologists) are trained to determine the specific corrective lenses that will provide the clearest, most comfortable, and most efficient vision, avoiding double vision and maximizing binocularity.

=== Over-the-counter correction ===
Ready-made single-vision reading glasses go by many names, including over-the-counter glasses, ready readers, cheaters, magnifiers, non-prescription readers, or generic readers. They are designed to lessen the focusing burden of near work, such as reading. They are typically sold in retail locations such as pharmacies and grocery stores but are also available in book stores and clothing retailers. They are available in common reading prescriptions with strengths ranging from +0.75 to +3.50 diopters. While these "magnifiers" do indeed make the image of the viewed object bigger, their main advantage comes from focusing the image, not magnification.

These glasses are not tailored to a person's individual needs. A difference in refractive error between the eyes or the presence of astigmatism will not be accounted for. People with little to no need for correction in the distance may find off-the-shelf glasses work quite well for seeing better during near vision tasks. But if the person has a significant need for distance correction, it is less likely that the over-the-counter glasses will be perfectly effective. Although such glasses are generally considered safe, an individual prescription, as determined by an ophthalmologist or optometrist and made by a qualified optician, usually results in better visual correction and fewer headaches and visual discomfort. Another criticism of over-the-counter glasses is that they may alleviate symptoms, causing a person to forgo the other benefits of routine vision exams, such as early diagnosis of chronic disease.

=== Self-selected corrective lenses ===
Although lenses are normally prescribed by optometrists or ophthalmologists, there is evidence from developing countries that allowing people to select lenses for themselves produces good results in the majority of cases and is less than a tenth of the cost of prescription lenses.

== Lens types ==
=== Single vision ===
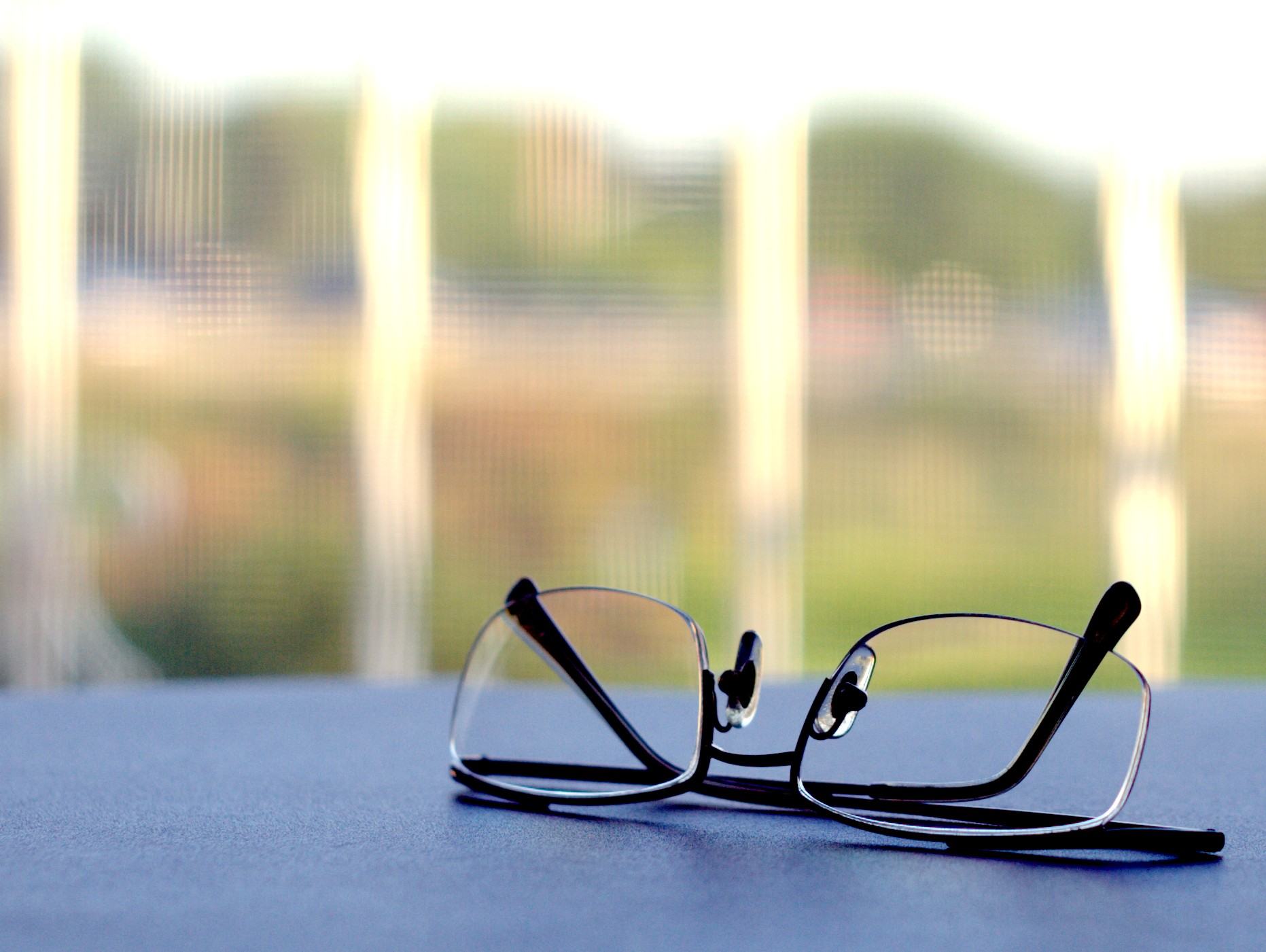
Typical pair of single vision glasses

Single vision lenses correct for only one distance. If they correct for far distance, the person must accommodate to see up close. If the person cannot accommodate, they may need a separate correction for near distances, or else use a multifocal lens (see below).

Reading glasses are single vision lenses designed for near work and include over the counter glasses. They come in two main styles: full frames, in which the entire lens is made in the reading prescription, and half-eyes, style glasses that sit lower down on the nose. Full frame readers must be removed to see distance clearly, while the distance can be clearly viewed over the top of half-eye readers.

=== Bifocal ===
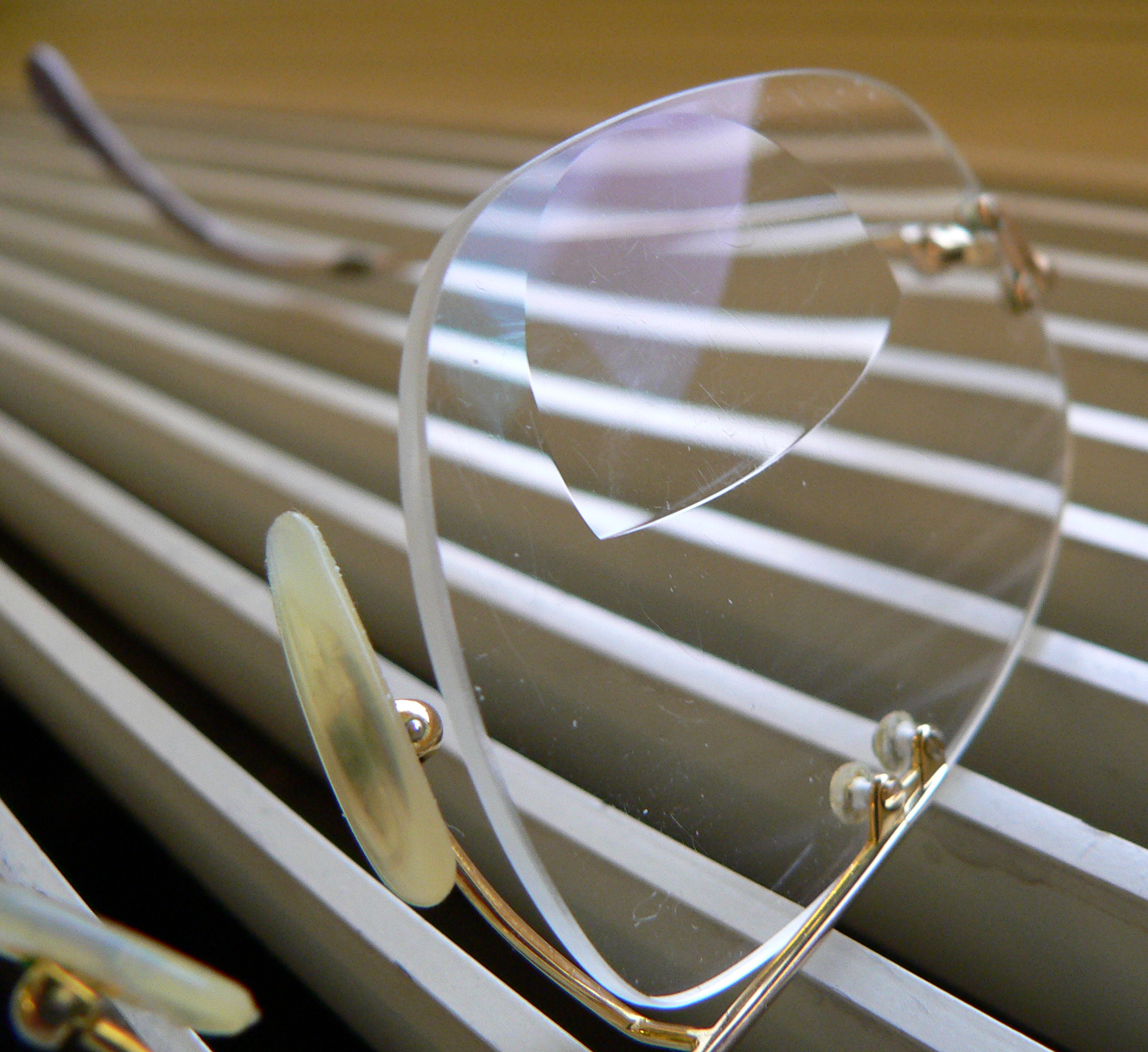
These bifocals are upside down as they rest on the surface. The add segment of the lens for near vision is the D-shaped area.

A bifocal is a lens with two sections, separated by a line (see image to the right). Generally, the upper part of the lens is used for distance vision, while the lower segment is used for near vision. The area of the lens that caters to near vision is called the add segment. There are many different shapes, sizes, and positions for the add segment, such as rounded bifocals and D segment bifocals, that are selected for functional differences as well as the visual demands of the patient. Bifocals allow people with presbyopia to see clearly at distance and near without having to remove the glasses, which would be required with single vision correction.

=== Trifocal ===
Trifocal lenses are similar to bifocals, except that the two focal areas are separated by a third area (with intermediate focus correction) in the middle. This segment corrects the wearer's vision for intermediate distances roughly at arms' length, e.g. computer distance. This lens type has two segment lines, dividing the three different correcting segments.

=== Progressive ===
Progressive addition or varifocal lenses provide a smooth transition from distance correction to near correction, eliminating segment lines and allowing clear vision at all distances, including intermediate (roughly arms' length). The lack of any abrupt change in power and the uniform appearance of the lens gives rise to the name "no-line bifocal".

=== Multifocal ===
Multifocal contact lenses (e.g. bifocals or progressives) are comparable to spectacles with bifocals or progressive lenses because they have multiple focal points. Multifocal contact lenses are typically designed for constant viewing through the center of the lens, but some designs do incorporate a shift in lens position to view through the reading power (similar to bifocal glasses).

=== Adjustable focus ===
The power or focal length of adjustable or variable focus can be changed to suit the needs of the wearer. A typical application of such a lens is to refocus the correction allowing clear vision at any distance. Unlike with bifocals, near-vision correction is achieved over the entire field of view, in any direction. Switching between distance and near vision is accomplished by re-adjusting the lens, instead of by tilting and/or rotating the head. The need for constant adjustment when the person's attention switches to an object at a different distance is a design challenge of such a lens. Manual adjustment is more cumbersome than bifocals or similar lenses. Automated systems require electronic systems, power supplies, and sensors that increase the cost, size, and weight of the correction.

=== Plano ===
A corrective lens with a power of zero is called a plano lens. These lenses are used when one or both eyes do not require correction of a refractive error. Some people with good natural eyesight like to wear eyeglasses as a style accessory, or want to change the appearance of their eyes using novelty contact lenses.

== Lens optical profile ==
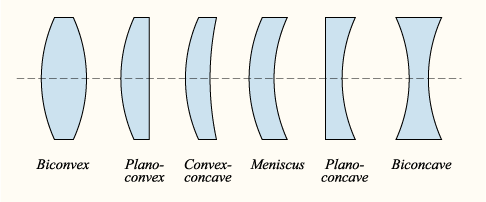
Common lens optical profiles

Although corrective lenses can be produced in many different profiles, the most common is ophthalmic or convex-concave. In an ophthalmic lens, both the front and back surfaces have a positive radius, resulting in a positive/convergent front surface and a negative/divergent back surface. The difference in curvature between the front and rear surface leads to the corrective power of the lens. In hyperopia a convergent lens is needed; therefore, the convergent front surface overpowers the divergent back surface. For myopia the opposite is true: the divergent back surface is greater in magnitude than the convergent front surface. To correct for presbyopia, the lens, or section of the lens, must be more convergent or less divergent than the person's distance lens.

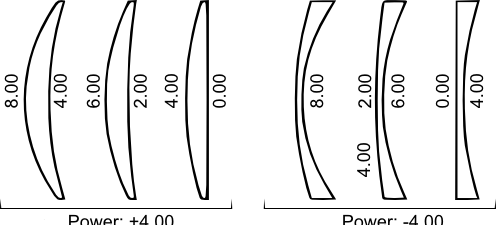
Constant corrective power with different base curves require varying the back surface curvature

The base curve (usually determined from the profile of the front surface of an ophthalmic lens) can be changed to result in the best optic and cosmetic characteristics across the entire surface of the lens. Optometrists may choose to specify a particular base curve when prescribing a corrective lens for either of these reasons. A multitude of mathematical formulas and professional clinical experience has allowed optometrists and lens designers to determine standard base curves that are ideal for most people. As a result, the front surface curve is more standardized and the characteristics that generate a person's unique prescription are typically derived from the geometry of the back surface of the lens.

=== Bifocals and trifocals ===
Bifocals and trifocals result in a more complex lens profile, compounding multiple surfaces. The main lens is composed of a typical ophthalmic lens. Thus the base curve defines the front surface of the main part of the lens while the back surface geometry is changed to achieve the desired distance power. The "bifocal" is a third spherical segment, called an add segment, found on the front surface of the lens. Steeper and more convergent than the base curve, the add segment combines with the back surface to deliver the person's near correction. Early manufacturing techniques fused a separate lens to the front surface, but modern processes cut all the geometry into a single piece of lens material. There are many locations, profiles, and sizes of add segments typically referred to as segment type. Some "seg type" examples include Flat top, Kryptok, Orthogon, Tillyer Executive, and Ultex A. Trifocals contain two add segments to achieve a lens that corrects the person's vision for three distinct distances.

The optical center of the add segment may be placed on the lens surface or may hang off into an empty space near the lens surface. Although the surface profile of a bifocal segment is spherical, it is often trimmed to have straight edges so that it is contained within a small region of the overall lens surface.

=== Progressive lens ===
The progressive addition lens (PAL, also commonly called a no-line or varifocal lens) eliminates the line in bi/tri-focals and is very complex in its profile. PALs are a continuously variable parametric surface that begins using one spherical surface base curve and ends at another, with the radius of curvature continuously varying as the transition is made from one surface to the other. This shift in curvature results in different powers being delivered from different locations on the lens.

== Vertex distance ==
Vertex distance is the space between the front of the eye and the back surface of the lens. In glasses with powers beyond ±4.00D, the vertex distance can affect the effective power of the glasses. A shorter vertex distance can expand the field of view, but if the vertex distance is too small, the eyelashes will come into contact with the back of the lens, smudging the lens and causing annoyance for the wearer. A skilled frame stylist will help the wearer select a good balance of fashionable frame size with good vertex distance to achieve ideal aesthetics and field of view. The average vertex distance in a pair of glasses is 12-14mm. A contact lens is placed directly on the eye and thus has a vertex distance of zero.

== Refractive index ==
In the UK and the US, the refractive index is generally specified concerning the yellow He-d Fraunhofer line, commonly abbreviated as n_{d}. Lens materials are classified by their refractive index, as follows:

- Normal index: 1.48 ≤ n_{d} < 1.54
- Mid-index: 1.54 ≤ n_{d} < 1.60
- High-index: 1.60 ≤ n_{d} < 1.74
- Very high index: 1.76 ≤ n_{d}

This is a general classification. Often for marketing purposes, materials with n_{d} values that are at or above 1.60 can be referred to as "high-index". Likewise, Trivex and other borderline normal / mid-index materials may be referred to as mid-index.

=== Advantages of higher indices ===
- Thinner, sometimes lighter lenses (See below).
- Improved UV protection over CR-39 and glass lenses.

=== Disadvantages of increased indices ===
- Lower Abbe number, meaning, amongst other things, increased chromatic aberration.
- Poorer light transmission and increased backside and inner-surface reflections (see Fresnel reflection equation), increasing the importance of anti-reflective coating.
- Manufacturing defects have more impact on optical quality.
- Theoretically, off-axis optical quality degrades (oblique astigmatic error). In practice this degradation should not be perceptible – current frame styles are much smaller than they would have to be for these aberrations to be noticeable to the patient, the aberration occurring some distance away from the optical centre of the lens (off-axis).

== Optical quality ==
=== Abbe number ===
Chromatic aberration caused by a convex lens

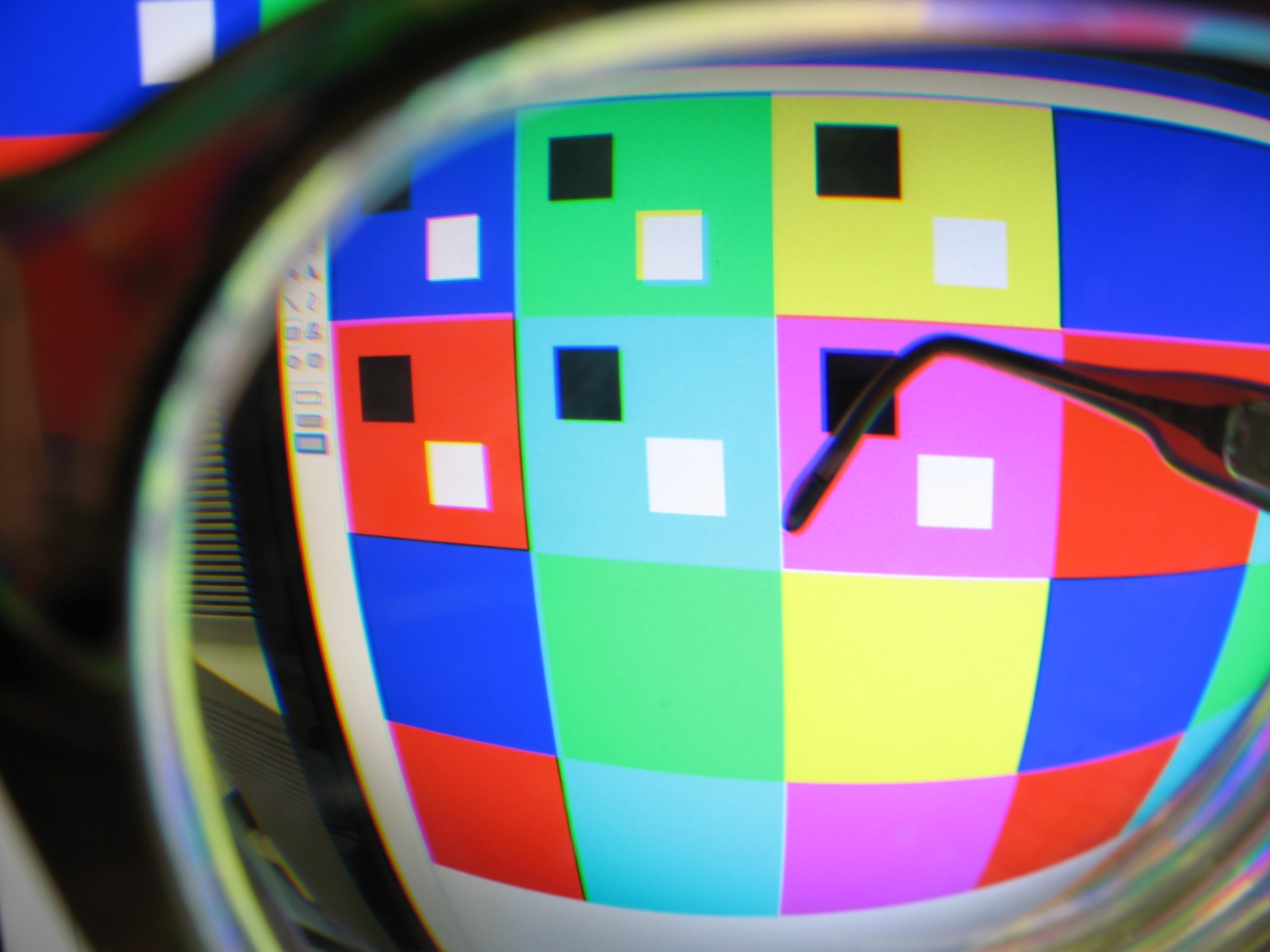
Prismatic color distortion shown with a camera set for nearsighted focus, and using -9.5 diopter eyeglasses to correct the camera's myopia.

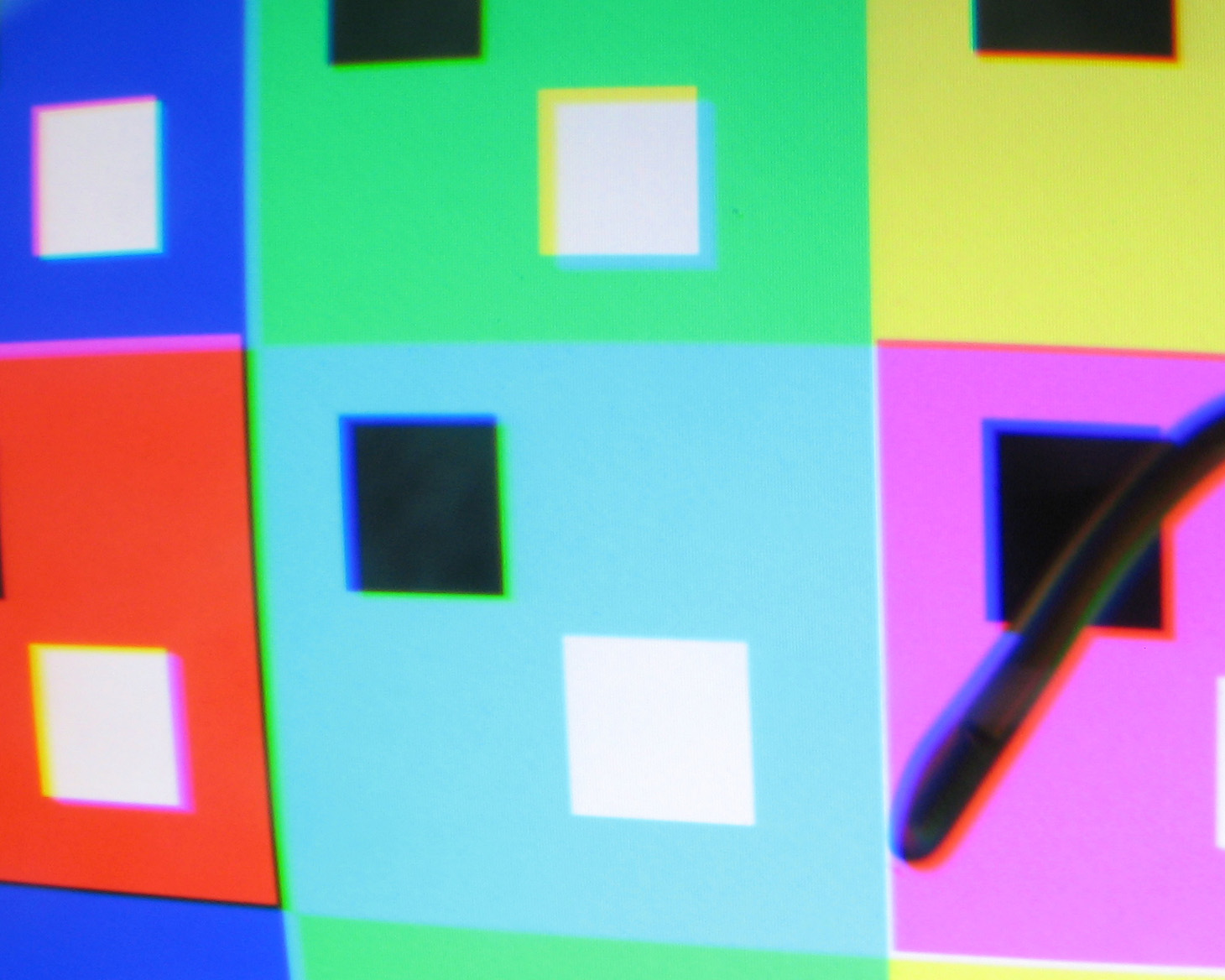
Close-up of color shifting through corner of an eyeglass lens. The visible colored fringing along the light and dark borders between color swatches are not actually on the color chart: They are the result of dispersion of colors by the lens.

Of all of the properties of particular lens material, the one that most closely relates to its optical performance is its dispersion, which is specified by the Abbe number. Higher Abbe numbers mean a better lens material, and lower Abbe numbers result in the presence of chromatic aberration (i.e., color fringes above/below or to the left/right of a high contrast object), especially in larger lens sizes and stronger prescriptions (beyond ±4.00D). Generally, lower Abbe numbers are a property of mid and higher index lenses that cannot be avoided, regardless of the material used. The Abbe number for a material at a particular refractive index formulation is usually specified as its Abbe value.

In practice, an Abbe number change from 30 to 32 will not have a practically noticeable benefit, but a change from 30 to 47 could be beneficial for users with strong prescriptions that move their eyes and look "off-axis" of the optical center of the lens. Some users do not sense color fringing directly but will just describe "off-axis blurriness". Abbe values even as high as that of ( V_{d} ≤ 45 ) produce chromatic aberrations which can be perceptible to a user in lenses larger than 40 mm in diameter and especially in strengths that are in excess of ±4 D. At ±8 D even glass ( V_{d} ≤ 58 ) produces chromatic aberration that can be noticed by a user. Chromatic aberration is independent of the lens being of spherical, aspheric, or atoric design.

The eye's Abbe number is independent of the importance of the corrective lens's Abbe, since the human eye:

- Moves to keep the visual axis close to its achromatic axis, which is completely free of dispersion (i.e., to see the dispersion one would have to concentrate on points in the periphery of vision, where visual clarity is quite poor)
- Is very insensitive, especially to color, in the periphery (i.e., at retinal points distant from the achromatic axis and thus not falling on the fovea, where the cone cells responsible for color vision are concentrated. See: Anatomy and Physiology of the Retina.)

In contrast, the eye moves to look through various parts of a corrective lens as it shifts its gaze, some of which can be as much as several centimeters off of the optical center. Thus, despite the eye's dispersive properties, the corrective lens's dispersion cannot be dismissed. People who are sensitive to the effects of chromatic aberrations, or who have stronger prescriptions, or who often look off the lens's optical center, or who prefer larger corrective lens sizes may be impacted by chromatic aberration. To minimize chromatic aberration:

- Try to use the smallest vertical lens size that is comfortable. Generally, chromatic aberrations are more noticeable as the pupil moves vertically below the optical center of the lens (e.g., reading or looking at the ground while standing or walking). Keep in mind that a smaller vertical lens size will result in a greater amount of vertical head movement, especially while performing activities that involve short and intermediate distance viewing, which could lead to an increase in neck strain, especially in occupations involving a large vertical field of view.
- Restrict the choice of lens material to the highest Abbe value at an acceptable thickness. The oldest most basic commonly used lens materials also happen to have the best optical characteristics at the expense of corrective lens thickness (i.e., cosmetics). Newer materials have focused on improved cosmetics and increased impact safety, at the expense of optical quality. Lenses sold in the US must pass the Food and Drug Administration ball-drop impact test, and depending on needed index these seem to currently have "best in class" Abbe vs Index ( N_{d} ): Glass (2× weight of plastics) or CR-39 (2 mm vs. 1.5 mm thickness typical on newer materials) 58 @ 1.5, Sola Spectralite (47 @ 1.53), Sola Finalite (43 @ 1.6), and Hoya Eyry (36 @ 1.7). For impact resistance safety glass is offered at a variety of indexes at high Abbe number, but is still 2x the weight of plastics. Polycarbonate ( V_{d} = 30–32 ) is very dispersive but has excellent shatter resistance. Trivex ( V_{d} = 43 @ 1.53 ), is also heavily marketed as an impact-resistant alternative to Polycarbonate, for individuals who do not need polycarbonate's index. Trivex is also one of the lightest materials available.
- Use contact lenses in place of or as well as eyeglasses. A contact lens rests directly on the surface of the cornea and moves in sync with all eye movements; consequently, a contact lens is always almost perfectly aligned on center with the pupil, and there is never any significant off-axis misalignment between the pupil and the optical center of the lens.

=== Power error ===
Power error is the change in the optical power of a lens as the eye looks through various points on the area of the lens. Generally, it is least present at the optic center and gets progressively worse as one looks towards the edges of the lens. The actual amount of power error is highly dependent on the strength of the prescription as well as whether a best spherical form of lens or an optically optimal aspherical form was used in the manufacture of the lens. Generally, the best spherical form lenses attempt to keep the ocular curve between four and seven diopters.

=== Lens induced oblique astigmatism ===
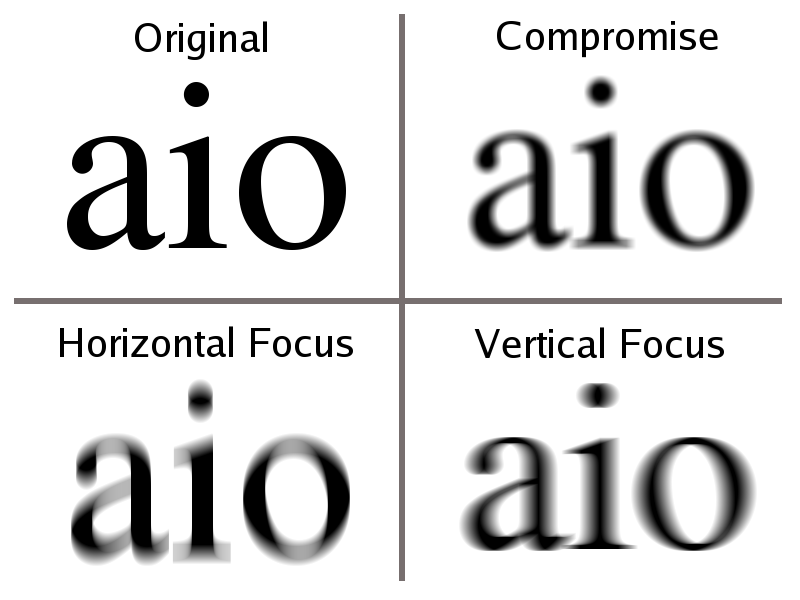
Effects of astigmatism

As the eye shifts its gaze from looking through the optical center of the corrective lens, the lens-induced astigmatism value increases. In a spherical lens, especially one with a strong correction whose base curve is not in the best spherical form, such increases can significantly impact the clarity of vision in the periphery.

=== Minimizing power error and lens induced astigmatism ===
As corrective power increases, even optimally designed lenses will have distortion that can be noticed by a user. This particularly affects individuals that use the off-axis areas of their lenses for visually demanding tasks. For individuals sensitive to lens errors, the best way to eliminate lens induced aberrations is to use contact lenses. Contacts eliminate all these aberrations since the lens then moves with the eye.

Barring contacts, a good lens designer does not have many parameters that can be traded off to improve vision. The index has little effect on error. Note that, although chromatic aberration is often perceived as "blurry vision" in the lens periphery and gives the impression of power error, this is actually due to color shifting. Chromatic aberration can be improved by using a material with improved ABBE. The best way to combat lens induced power error is to limit the choice of corrective lens to one that is in the best spherical form. A lens designer determines the best-form spherical curve using the Oswalt curve on the Tscherning ellipse. This design gives the best achievable optical quality and least sensitivity to lens fitting. A flatter base-curve is sometimes selected for cosmetic reasons. Aspheric or atoric design can reduce errors induced by using a suboptimal flatter base-curve. They cannot surpass the optical quality of a spherical best-form lens but can reduce the error induced by using a flatter-than-optimal base curve. The improvement due to flattening is most evident for strong farsighted lenses. High myopes (-6D) may see a slight cosmetic benefit with larger lenses. Mild prescriptions will have no perceptible benefit (-2D). Even at high prescriptions, some high myope prescriptions with small lenses may not see any difference, since some aspheric lenses have a spherically designed center area for improved vision and fit.

In practice, labs tend to produce pre-finished and finished lenses in groups of narrow power ranges to reduce inventory. Lens powers that fall into the range of the prescriptions of each group share a constant base curve. For example, corrections from -4.00D to -4.50D may be grouped and forced to share the same base curve characteristics, but the spherical form is only best for a -4.25D prescription. In this case, the error will be imperceptible to the human eye. However, some manufacturers may further cost-reduce inventory and group over a larger range which will result in perceptible error for some users in the range who also use the off-axis area of their lens. Additionally, some manufacturers may verge toward a slightly flatter curve. Although if only a slight bias toward plano is introduced it may be negligible cosmetically and optically. These optical degradations due to base-curve grouping also apply to aspherics since their shapes are intentionally flattened and then asphericized to minimize error for the average base curve in the grouping.

== Cosmetics and weight ==
=== Reducing lens thickness ===
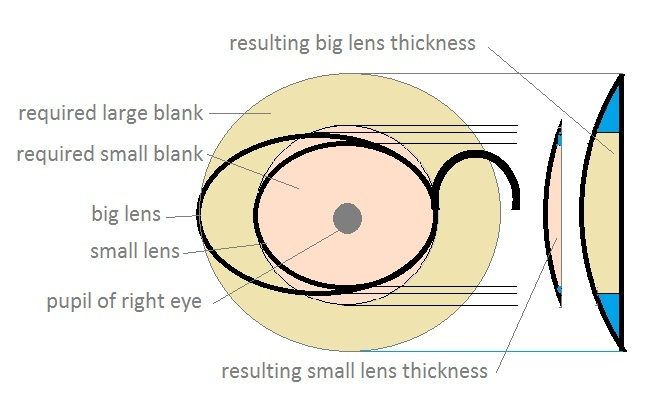
Crude relationship between lens size and its thickness for the same radius of curvature. In addition to its smaller surface area, the small lens is also much thinner and so is much lighter.

The greatest cosmetic improvement on lens thickness (and weight) benefits from choosing a frame that holds physically small lenses. The smallest of the popular adult lens sizes available in retail outlets is about 50 mm (2.0 in) across. There are a few adult sizes of 40 mm (1.6 in), and although they are quite rare, can reduce lens weight to about half of the 50 mm versions. The curves on the front and back of a lens are ideally formed with the specific radius of a sphere. This radius is set by the lens designer based on the prescription and cosmetic consideration. Selecting a smaller lens will mean less of this sphere surface is represented by the lens surface, meaning the lens will have a thinner edge (myopia) or center (hyperopia). A thinner edge reduces light entering into the edge, reducing an additional source of internal reflections.

Extremely thick lenses for myopia can be beveled to reduce flaring out of the very thick edge. Thick myopic lenses are not usually mounted in wire frames, because the thin wire contrasts against the thick lens, to make its thickness much more obvious to others.

The index can improve the lens thinness, but at a point, no more improvement will be realized. For example, if an index and lens size is selected with center to edge thickness difference of 1 mm then changing index can only improve thickness by a fraction of this. This is also true with aspheric design lenses.

The lens's minimum thickness can also be varied. The FDA ball drop test (5/8" 0.56-ounce steel ball dropped from 50 inches) effectively sets the minimum thickness of materials. Glass or CR-39 requires 2.0 mm, but some newer materials only require 1.5 mm or even 1.0 mm minimum thickness.

=== Weight ===
Material density typically increases as lens thickness is reduced by increasing index. There is also a minimum lens thickness required to support the lens shape. These factors result in a thinner lens which is not lighter than the original. There are lens materials with lower density at higher index which can result in a truly lighter lens. These materials can be found in a material property table. Reducing frame lens size will give the most noticeable improvement in weight for a given material. Ways to reduce the weight and thickness of corrective lenses, in approximate order of importance are these:

- Choose glasses frames with small lenses; that is to say so that the longest measurement across the lens at any angle is as short as possible. This gives the greatest advantage of all.
- Choose a frame that allows the pupil to occupy the exact middle point of the lens.
- Choose a lens as near round as possible. These are less commonly found than other shapes.
- Choose as high a refractive index for the lens material as cost permits.

It is not always possible to follow the above points, because of the rarity of such frames, and the need for a more pleasing appearance. However, these are the main factors to consider if ever it should become necessary and possible to do so.

=== Facial distortion and social stigma ===
Eyeglasses for a high-diopter nearsighted or farsighted person cause a visible distortion of their face as seen by other people, in the apparent size of the eyes and facial features visible through the eyeglasses.

- For extreme nearsightedness, the eyes appear small and sunken into the face, and the sides of the skull can be visible through the lens. This gives the wearer the appearance of having a very large or fat head in contrast with their eyes.
- For extreme farsightedness the eyes appear very large on the face, making the wearer's head seem too small.

Either situation can result in social stigma due to some facial distortions. This can result in the low self-esteem of the eyeglass wearer and lead to difficulty in making friends and developing relationships.

People with very high-power corrective lenses can benefit socially from contact lenses because these distortions are minimized and their facial appearance to others is normal. Aspheric/atoric eyeglass design can also reduce minification and magnification of the eye for observers at some angles.

== Lens materials ==
=== Optical crown glass ===
- Refractive index (n_{d}): 1.52288
- Abbe number (V_{d}): 58.5
- Density: 2.56 g/cm^{3} (the heaviest corrective lens material in common use, today)
- UV cutoff: 320 nm

Glass lenses have become less common owing to the danger of shattering and their relatively high weight compared to CR-39 plastic lenses. They still remain in use for specialised circumstances, for example in extremely high prescriptions (currently, glass lenses can be manufactured up to a refractive index of 1.9) and in certain occupations where the hard surface of glass offers more protection from sparks or shards of material. If the highest Abbe number is desired, the only choices for common lens optical material are optical crown glass and CR-39.

Higher-quality optical-grade glass materials exist (e.g. Borosilicate crown glasses such as BK7 ( n_{d} = 1.51680 , V_{d} = 64.17 , D = 2.51 g/cm³ ), which is commonly used in telescopes and binoculars, and fluorite crown glasses such as the best optical quality low dispersion glass currently in production, N-FK58 made by the German company Schott with the following characteristics ( n_{d} = 1.456 , V_{d} = 90.90 , D = 3.65 g/cm³ ) and are commonly used in high-end camera lenses).

One must bear in mind that the human eye itself has an Abbe number V_{d} ≈ 50.2 so the expensive, high-end optical glass types mentioned above have little value for central vision; however, the wearer's view through the side of a glass lens is not comparable to central vision through the eye: Low dispersion glass definitely makes optically superior corrective lenses since it greatly reduces color-fringing of edge-wise viewed contrasty objects, compared to all available plastics. But glass lenses are much heavier, and making them requires specialized glass grinding equipment no longer common in ordinary prescription lens labs: At present, one is often hard-pressed to find an optical laboratory that has the machinery needed shape custom glass lenses.

A further complication for seeking lenses made of better, even-lower dispersion glass, is that the specialty glass is often expensive. Also, many exotic glass types, with Abbe number V_{d} ≳ 65 , contain oxides of heavy metals such as arsenic or lanthanum, some of which are toxic. The need for special venting to protect technicians from exposure to powdered toxic glass further limits the number of optical labs that can safely grind super-low dispersion / large Abbe number glass.

Abbe numbers (V_{d}) in excess of Crown Glass and CR-39 are mainly warranted only for unusual special uses, such as

- extreme positive or negative diopter prescriptions
- very large size lenses, such as might cover a good portion of the face
- low wearer tolerance of color fringing
- occupations that involve work with very high contrast elements (e.g. reading dark print on white paper under bright light)
- construction work that requires viewing contrasting dark building elements against a cloudy white sky
- workplace with bright recessed can lighting or other darkened room lighting, concentrated on a small areas, shining on bright reflective surfaces (e.g. display counters at jeweler stores).

=== Optical plastics ===
Plastic lenses are currently the most commonly prescribed lens, owing to their relative safety, low cost, ease of production, and high optical quality. The main drawbacks of many types of plastic lenses are the ease by which a lens can be scratched, and the limitations and costs of producing higher-index lenses.

==== CR-39 ====
- Refractive index (n_{d}): 1.498 (standard)
- Abbe number (V_{d}): 59.3
- Density: 1.31 g/cm^{3}
- UV cutoff: 355 nm

CR-39 lenses are inherently scratch resistant.

==== Trivex ====
- Refractive index (n_{d}): 1.532
- Abbe number (V_{d}): 43–45 (depending on licensing manufacturer)
- Density: 1.1 g/cm^{3} (the lightest corrective lens material in common use)
- UV cutoff: 394 nm

Trivex was invented by Edwin C. Slagel and patented in September 1998.

Trivex was developed in 2001 by PPG Industries for the military as transparent armor. With Hoya Corporation and Younger Optics, PPG announced the availability of Trivex for the optical industry in 2001. Trivex is a urethane-based pre-polymer. PPG named the material Trivex because of its three main performance properties: Superior optics, ultra lightweight, and extreme strength.

Trivex possesses the UV-blocking properties and shatter resistance of polycarbonate while at the same time offering far superior optical quality (i.e., higher Abbe number) and a slightly lower density. Its lower refractive index of n_{d} = 1.532 vs. polycarbonate's 1.586 may result in slightly thicker lenses depending upon the prescription. Along with polycarbonate and the various high-index plastics, Trivex is a lab favorite for use in rimless frames, owing to the ease with which it can be drilled and its resistance to cracking around the drill holes. One other advantage that Trivex has over polycarbonate is that it can be tinted.

==== Polycarbonate ====
- Refractive index (n_{d}): 1.586
- Abbe number (V_{d}): 30
- Density: 1.2 g/cm^{3}
- UV cutoff: 385 nm

Polycarbonate is lighter weight than normal plastic. It blocks UV rays, is shatter resistant, and is used in sports glasses and glasses for children and teenagers. Because polycarbonate is soft and will scratch easily, a scratch-resistant coating is typically applied after shaping and polishing the lens. Standard polycarbonate with an Abbe number of 30 is one of the worst materials optically if chromatic aberration intolerance is of concern. Along with Trivex and the high-index plastics, polycarbonate is an excellent choice for rimless eyeglasses. Similar to the high-index plastics, polycarbonate has a very low Abbe number, which may be bothersome to individuals sensitive to chromatic aberrations.

==== High-index plastics (thiourethanes) ====
- Refractive index (n_{d}): 1.600–1.740
- Abbe number (V_{d}): 42–32 (higher indexes generally result in lower Abbe numbers)
- Density: 1.3–1.5 (g/cm^{3})
- UV cutoff: 380–400 nm

High-index plastics allow for thinner lenses. The lenses may not be lighter, however, due to the increase in density vs. mid- and normal index materials. A disadvantage is that high-index plastic lenses have a much higher level of chromatic aberrations, which can be seen from their lower Abbe numbers. Aside from the thinness of the lens, another advantage of high-index plastics is their strength and shatter resistance, although not as shatter resistant as polycarbonate. This makes them particularly suitable for rimless eyeglasses.

These high-refractive-index plastics are typically thiourethanes, with the sulfur atoms in the polymer being responsible for the high refractive index. The sulfur content can be up to 60 percent by weight for a material with index n_{d} = 1.74 .

=== Ophthalmic material property tables ===
Glass
Material	Refrac- tive index	Abbe number	Specific gravity	UVB	UVA	Reflected light (Note: Reflected light calculated using Fresnel reflection equation for normal waves against air on two interfaces. This is a reflection without an AR coating.)	Minimum thickness typ / min	Notes
Material	(n_{d})	(V_{d})	(g/cm³)	UVB	UVA	Reflected light	(mm)	Notes
1.6 Glass	1.604	40	2.62 g/cm^{3}	100%	61%	10.68%		VisionEase, X-Cel
1.7 Glass	1.706	30	2.93 g/cm^{3}	100%	76%	13.47%		X-Cel, VisionEase, Phillips
1.8 Glass	1.800	25	3.37 g/cm^{3}	100%	81%	16.47%		X-Cell, Phillips, VisionEase, Zhong Chuan Optical (China)
1.9 Glass	1.893	31	4.02 g/cm^{3}	100%	76%	18.85%		Zeiss, Zhong Chuan Optical (China)
Crown Glass	1.525	59	2.54 g/cm^{3}	79%	20%	8.59%		
PhotoGray Extra	1.523	57	2.41 g/cm^{3}	100%	97%	8.59%		

Optical plastics
Material	Refrac- tive index	Abbe number	Specific gravity	UVB	UVA	HDT	Reflected light (Note: Reflected light calculated from N_{d} using Fresnel reflection equation for normal waves against air on two interfaces. This is a reflection without an AR coating.)	Minimum thickness	Notes
Material	(n_{d})	(V_{d})	(g/cm³)	UVB	UVA	HDT	Reflected light	(mm)	Notes
CR-39 Hard Resin	1.49	59	1.31 g/cm^{3}	100%	90%		7.97%	2.0 mm	
NK-55	1.56	38	1.28 g/cm^{3}						
Essilor Ormix 1.6	1.6	41	1.30 g/cm^{3}	100%	100%		10.65%		
Hoya EYRY	1.70	36	1.41 g/cm^{3}	100%	100%		13.44%	1.5 mm	
MR-6 1.6 Plastic	1.6	36	1.34 g/cm^{3}	100%	100%		10.57%		
MR-7 1.665 Plastic	1.665	32	1.35 g/cm^{3}	100%	100%		12.45%	1.2 mm	Daemyung Optical (Ramia)
MR-7 1.67 Plastic	1.67	32	1.35 g/cm^{3}	100%	100%	85 °C	12.26%		
MR-8 1.6 Plastic	1.6	41	1.30 g/cm^{3}	100%	100%	118 °C	10.43%		
MR-10 1.67 Plastic	1.67	32	1.37 g/cm^{3}	100%	100%	100 °C	12.34%		
MR-20 1.6 Plastic	1.60	42	1.30 g/cm^{3}	100%	100%		10.65%		
MR-174 1.74 Plastic	1.74	33	1.47 g/cm^{3}	100%	100%	78 °C	14.36%		Hyperindex 174 (Optima)
Nikon 4 Plastic NL4	1.67	32	1.35 g/cm^{3}	100%	100%		12.59%		
Nikon 5 Plastic NL5	1.74	33	1.46 g/cm^{3}	100%	100%		14.59%		
Polycarbonate	1.586	30	1.20 g/cm^{3}	100%	100%		10.27%	1.0 mm	Tegra (Vision-Ease) Airwear (Essilor)
PPG Trivex (average)	1.53	44	1.11 g/cm^{3}	100%	100%		8.70%	1.0 mm	PPG, Augen, HOYA, Thai Optical, X-cel, Younger
SOLA Finalite	1.60	42	1.22 g/cm^{3}	100%	100%		10.65%		
SOLA Spectralite	1.54	47	1.21 g/cm^{3}	100%	98%		8.96%		(also Vision 3456 (Kodak)?)
Tokai	1.76	30	1.49 g/cm^{3}	100%	100%		15.16%		

Indices of refraction for a range of materials can be found in the list of refractive indices.

== Lens coatings ==
=== Anti-reflective ===
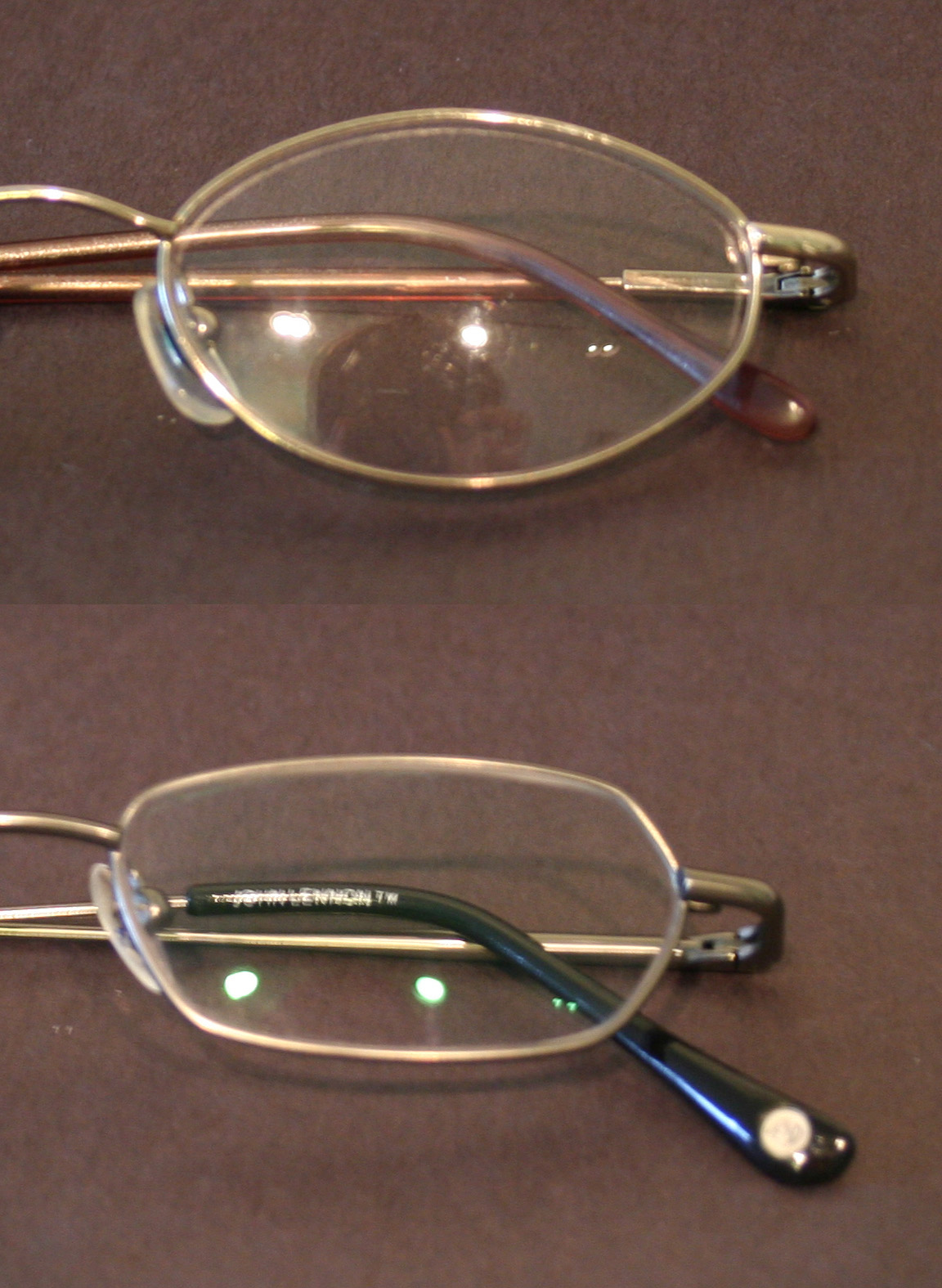
The effects of an anti-reflective coating applied (as seen on the bottom picture) as compared to regular eyeglass lens (notice how the reflection of the photographer in the top lens is clearly visible)

Anti-reflective coatings help to make the eye behind the lens more visible. They also help lessen back reflections of the white of the eye as well as bright objects behind the eyeglasses wearer (e.g. windows, lamps). Such a reduction of back reflections increases the apparent contrast of surroundings. At night, anti-reflective coatings help to reduce headlight glare from oncoming cars, street lamps, and heavily lit or neon signs.

One problem with anti-reflective coatings is that historically they have been very easy to scratch. Newer coatings try to address this problem by combining scratch resistance with the anti-reflective coating. They also offer a measure of dirt and smudge resistance, due to their hydrophobic qualities.

=== Ultraviolet protection ===
A UV coating is used to reduce the transmission of light in the ultraviolet spectrum. UV-B radiation increases the likelihood of cataracts, while long-term exposure to UV-A radiation can damage the retina. DNA damage from UV light is cumulative and irreversible. Some materials such as Trivex and Polycarbonate, naturally block most UV light; they have UV-cutoff wavelengths just outside the visible range and do not benefit from the application of a UV coating. Many modern anti-reflective coatings also block UV.

=== Scratch resistance ===
Resists damage to lens surfaces from minor scratches.

== Confusing corrective lens industry terminology ==
=== Spheric vs. aspheric, atoric, etc. ===
Lens manufacturers claim that aspheric lenses improve vision over traditional spheric lenses. This statement could be misleading to individuals who do not know that the lenses are being implicitly compared to "a spheric flattened away from best-form for cosmetic reasons".

This qualification is necessary since best-form spherics are always better than aspherics for an ophthalmic lens application. Aspherics are only used for corrective lenses when, in order to achieve a flatter lens for cosmetic reasons, the lens design deviates from the best-form sphere; this results in degradation of the visual correction, degradation which can, in some part, be compensated for by an aspheric design. The same is true for atoric and bi-aspheric.

While it is true that aspheric lenses are used in cameras and binoculars, it would be wrong to assume that this means aspherics/atorics result in better optics for eyewear. Cameras and telescopes use multiple lens elements and have different design criteria. Spectacles are made of only one ophthalmic lens, and the best-form spheric lens has been shown to give the best vision. In cases where best-form is not used, such as cosmetic flattening, thinning or wrap-around sunglasses, an aspheric design can reduce the amount of induced optical distortions.

It is worth noting that aspheric lenses are a broad category. A lens is made of two curved surfaces, and an aspheric lens is a lens where one or both of those surfaces is not spherical. Further research and development is being conducted to determine whether the mathematical and theoretical benefits of aspheric lenses can be implemented in practice in a way that results in better vision correction.

=== Optical aberrations of the eye lens vs. corrective lens ===
Optical terms are used to describe errors in the eye's lens and the corrective lens. This can cause confusion since "astigmatism" or "ABBE" has a drastically different impact on vision depending on which lens has the error.

=== Astigmatism disambiguation ===
Astigmatism of the eye: Patients who are prescribed a sphere and a cylinder prescription have astigmatism of the eye, and can be given a toric lens to correct it.

Astigmatism of the corrective lens: This phenomenon is called lens-induced oblique astigmatism error (OAE) or power error and is induced when the eye looks through the ophthalmic lens at a point oblique to the optical center (OC). This may become especially evident beyond -6D.

Example: A patient with astigmatism (or no astigmatism) of the eye and a high prescription may notice astigmatism of the lens (OAE) when looking through the corner of their glasses.

=== Aspheric and atoric disambiguation ===
In ophthalmic terminology, "aspheric lens" specifically refers to a subclass of aspheric lens. Designs that feature "flatter" curves trade optical quality for cosmetic appearance. By using a non-spheric lens shape, an aspheric lens attempts to correct the error induced by flattening the lens. Typically, the design focuses on reducing the error (OAE) across the horizontal and vertical lens axis edges. This is of primary benefit to farsighted individuals, whose lenses have a thick center.

An atoric lens design refers to a lens with a more complex aspheric lens design. An atoric lens design can address errors over more corners of the lens, not just the horizontal and vertical axis.

A toric lens is designed to compensate for the astigmatism of a patient's eye. Even though this lens is technically "aspheric", the terms "aspheric" and "atoric" are reserved for lenses which correct errors induced by cosmetic lens flattening.

== U.S. legal requirements for prescriptions ==
In the United States, laws at the federal and state level govern the provision and effective dates of prescriptions for contact lenses and eyeglasses. Federal law requires that eyeglass and contact lens prescriptions be given to every consumer and that the prescriptions be for a minimum of one year. (FTC Section 456.2 "Separation of examination and dispensing" was reviewed in 2004: FTC 2004 review of section 456.2).

State laws vary. For example, California law also requires prescriptions to be provided to clients whether demanded or not. Eyeglass prescriptions must be for a minimum of two years, and contact prescriptions must be for a minimum of one year.

== See also ==
- Contact lens
- Dioptre
- Eyeglass prescription
- Lorgnette
- Monocle
- Photochromic lens
- Pince-nez
- Visual acuity
