= Trifocal lenses =

Lenses with three areas of distinct optical power

Trifocal lenses

Trifocals are eyeglasses with lenses that have three regions which correct for distance, intermediate (arm's length), and near vision. John Isaac Hawkins developed the trifocal lens in 1827.

Trifocals are mostly used by people with advanced presbyopia who have been prescribed 2 diopters or more of reading addition. The intermediate addition is normally half the reading addition. So, for someone with a distance prescription of −4 diopters and a reading addition of +3, the reading portion of their trifocals would have a net power of −1, and the intermediate segment would be −2.5 diopters.

Trifocal lenses are made in similar styles to bifocals, but with an additional segment for intermediate vision above the reading section. A common style is the 7×28 flat-top or D-shaped segment, 28 mm wide, with a 7 mm high intermediate segment. Larger intermediate segments are available, and are particularly useful for people who spend a lot of time using computers.

Trifocals are becoming rarer as more people choose to wear progressive lenses.

== See also ==
- Trifocal goggle
