= Focometer =

A focometer is an instrument that measures refractive errors and is intended to provide spherical eyeglass prescriptions to rural or economically disadvantaged populations without the need for complicated protocols, expensive equipment, or electricity. The focometer is monocular and hand-held, and is normally used in natural lighting. Patients rotate a collar on the focometer until the best focus is achieved. The individual's refractive power is then read off a linear dioptre scale.

The focometer was developed by Drs. Ian Berger and Larry Spitzberg at the University of Houston College of Optometry in Houston, Texas, to provide a simple, inexpensive means for measuring refractive error in human vision. The portable, hand-held instrument is highly appropriate for use in remote and poor areas.

Focometers measure spherical refractive errors. Astigmatism can also be measured using a "clock target" with the device. A study has found, however, that the focometer is less effective for identifying astigmatism than an autorefractor, and that its axis accuracy is limited to 15°.

The advantages of a focometer over other methods for use in developing countries are that it is lightweight, compact, relatively inexpensive, fairly quick, and easy to use with minimal training. A clinical trial compared the repeatability, validity, and ease of use of the focometer with an autorefractor. It found that the focometer results were within 0.75 dioptres of the autorefractor value 84% of the time. The authors found that repeatability of the measurements improved when patients were allowed to "practice" twice on each eye before taking the real reading.
