= George Whatley =

George Whatley (died 1791) was an English lawyer, a friend and correspondent of Benjamin Franklin. He was also Vice President (1772–1779) and Treasurer (1779–1791) of the Foundling Hospital in London.

Whatley was the author of Principles of Trade, published in 1774, which expounded the benefits of laissez faire economics, allied to free trade. Some sources claim Franklin co-authored the book with Whatley, while Franklin gives full credit to Whatley. Jared Sparks in The Works of Benjamin Franklin 1840, credits Franklin for the notes: these are in the view of noted economist Jacob Viner, superior to the text.

Whatley's portrait by an unknown painter is part of the Foundling Hospital art collection, at the Foundling Museum.
