= Presbyopia =

Worsening ability of the eyes to focus with age

- Other names: The aging eye condition
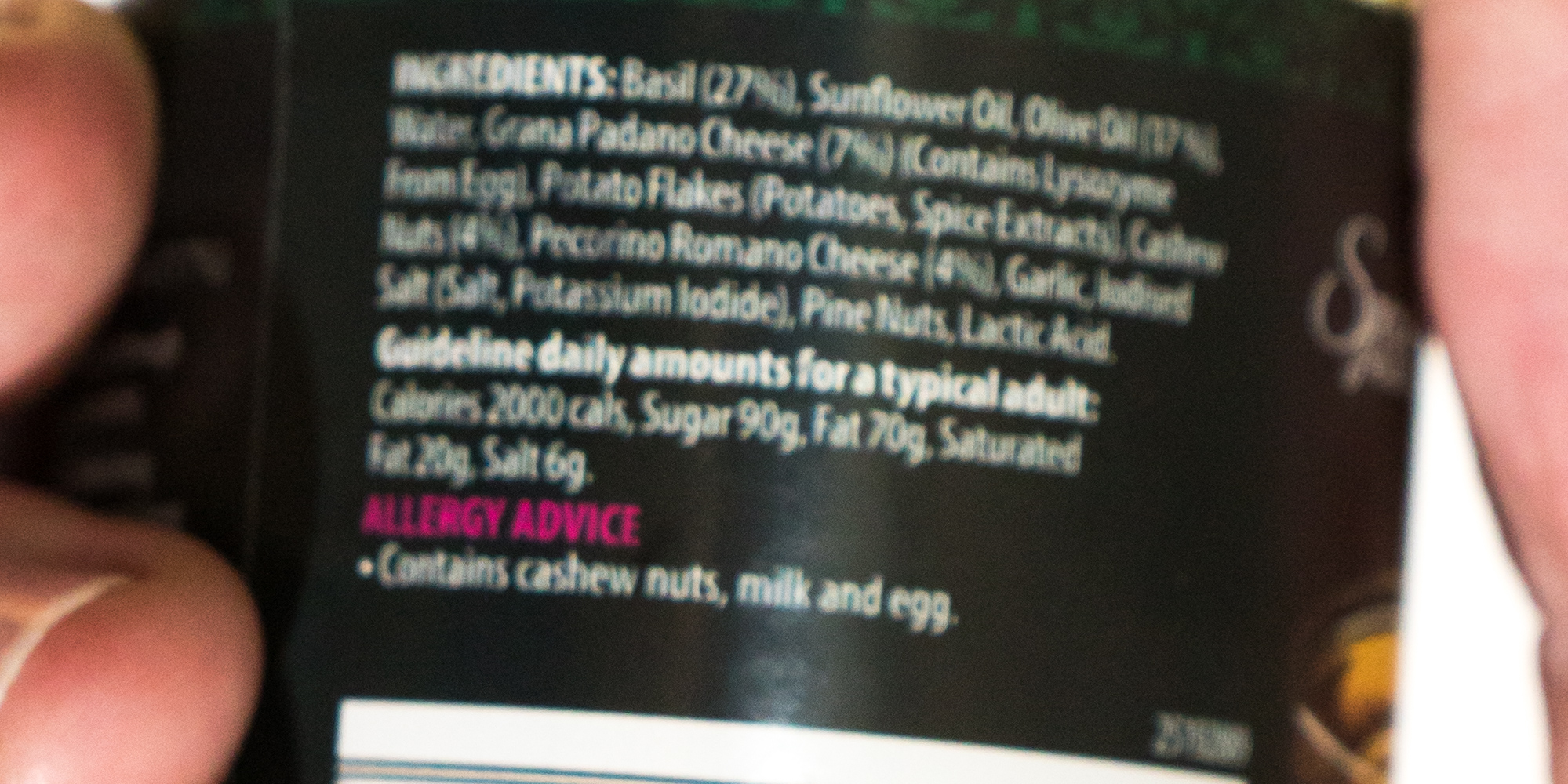
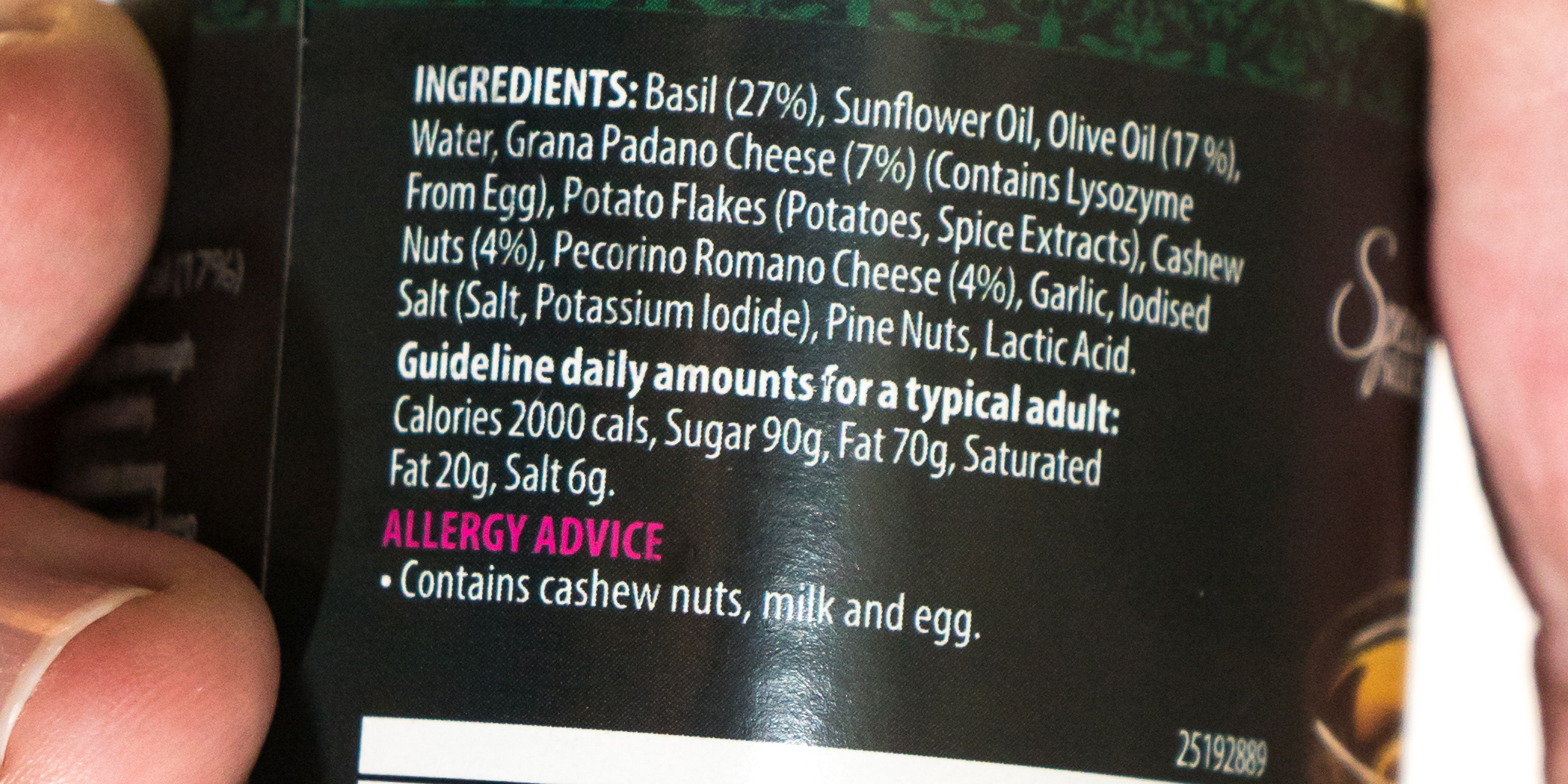
- A person with presbyopia cannot easily read the small print of the ingredients list on a bottle of pesto (top), which appears clearer to someone without presbyopia (bottom).
- Specialty: Optometry, ophthalmology
- Symptoms: Difficulty reading small print, having to hold reading material farther away, headaches, eyestrain
- Usual onset: Progressively worsening in those over 40 years old
- Causes: Aging-related stiffening of the lens of the eye
- Diagnostic method: Eye exam
- Treatment: Eyeglasses, contact lenses
- Frequency: 25% currently; all eventually affected

Presbyopia is a physiological insufficiency of optical accommodation associated with the aging of the eye; it results in progressively worsening ability to focus clearly on close objects. Also known as age-related farsightedness (or as age-related long sight in the UK), it affects many adults over the age of 40. A common sign of presbyopia is difficulty in reading small print, which results in having to hold reading material farther away. Other symptoms associated can be headaches and eyestrain. Different people experience different degrees of problems. Other types of refractive errors may exist at the same time as presbyopia. While exhibiting similar symptoms of blur in the vision for close objects, this condition has nothing to do with hypermetropia or far-sightedness, which is almost invariably present in newborns and usually decreases as the newborn gets older.

Presbyopia is a typical part of the aging process. It occurs due to age-related changes in the lens (decreased elasticity and increased hardness) and ciliary muscle (decreased strength and ability to move the lens), causing the eye to focus light right behind rather than on the retina when looking at close objects. It is a type of refractive error, along with nearsightedness, farsightedness, and astigmatism. Diagnosis is by an eye examination.

Presbyopia can be corrected using glasses, contact lenses, multifocal intraocular lenses, or LASIK (PresbyLASIK) surgery. The most common treatment is glass correction using appropriate convex lens. Glasses prescribed to correct presbyopia may be simple reading glasses, bifocals, trifocals, or progressive lenses. Pilocarpine eye drops are a recently FDA-approved treatment for presbyopia.

People over 40 are at risk for developing presbyopia and all people become affected to some degree. An estimated 25% of people (1.8 billion globally) had presbyopia as of 2015.

== Signs and symptoms ==
Presbyopia is a normal part of aging, with most people noticing progressive changes in their near vision after the age of 40, worsening until age 65. Common symptoms include decreased focusing ability for near objects, eye strain, and headache. Eye strain is the feeling of soreness and tiredness in the eyes. When reading or doing close-up work, those with presbyopia may compensate with reading at brighter lights and holding material at an arm's length. A cardinal symptom that individuals with presbyopia may describe is "short arms", or an inability to hold reading material far enough from their eyes to read clearly. Those with presbyopia may also have difficulties transitioning between seeing at a near and far distance. These issues focusing can also result in squinting and drowsiness while doing close-up tasks. Presbyopia generally does not affect a person's ability to focus on distant objects.

== Causes ==
The main risk factor for presbyopia is being older than 40. Those at risk for premature presbyopia, which is the onset of presbyopia before age 40, include individuals with hyperopia, or farsightedness, who may experience symptoms of presbyopia earlier than individuals with myopia, or nearsightedness. Taking certain medications, like antihistamines, antidepressants, and diuretics have also been linked with premature presbyopia. Having diabetes, cardiovascular disease, or multiple sclerosis can also increase risk for premature presbyopia. Premature menopause, anemia, prior eye or head trauma, and early surgeries on the lens of the eye such as cataract surgery can also predispose an individual to premature presbyopia.

== Mechanism ==
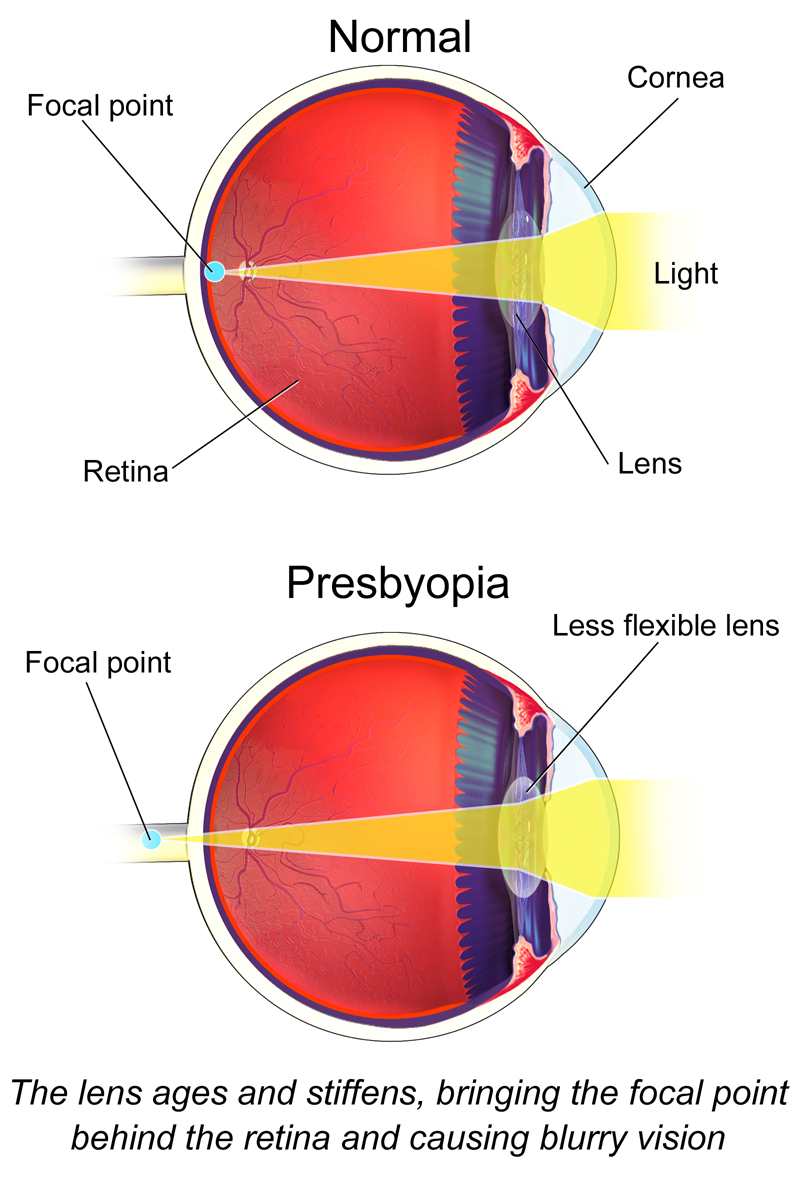
Presbyopia

As a person ages, their eyes' accommodation reflex, which is the visual reflex for focusing on objects near the eye, becomes less capable. This is measured through an individual's accommodative amplitude, which stays stable at around 7-10 diopters for the first twenty years of life. From 20 to 50 years old, a person's accommodative amplitude gradually decreases to about 0.5 diopters. The expected, maximum, and minimum amplitudes of accommodation in diopters (D) for a corrected patient of a given age can be estimated using Hofstetter's formulas: expected amplitude (D) = 18.5 − 0.3 × (age in years); maximum amplitude (D) = 25 − 0.4 × (age in years); minimum amplitude (D) = 15 − 0.25 × (age in years).

The main theory behind this age-related loss of accommodation is the stiffening of the crystalline lens. The lens in the eye is responsible for about one-third of the eye's total refractive power, with the cornea being responsible for the other two-thirds of refraction. When ciliary muscles contract, it causes the attached zonular fibers to loosen and round the lens for near vision. The round state of the lens is what allows for near vision. However, the lens is able to adjust its refractive power through changing its shape. With age, the lens loses flexibility through progressive nuclear sclerosis, a process in which the insoluble crystallin proteins in the eye aggregate and cross-link, causing rigidity and stiffness. When the lens is overly stiff, it is overly resistant to ciliary muscle contraction, meaning the zonular fibers remain stretched and the lens remains focused for more distant vision.

== Diagnosis ==
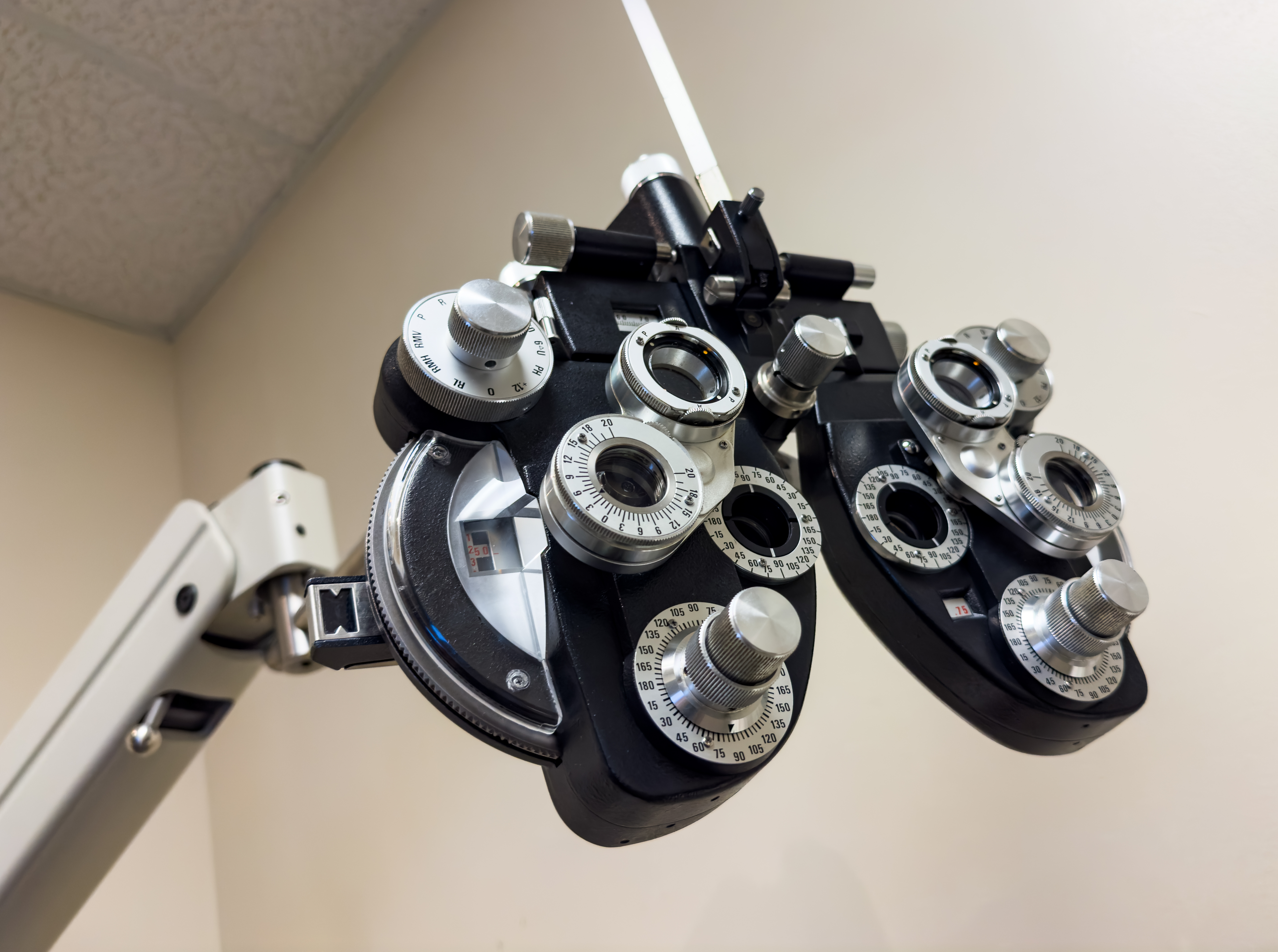
A phoropter is a device that measures refraction in the eyes and determines the correction necessary for adequate near and far sight. It is a common part of the refractive eye exam needed for presbyopia diagnosis.

A comprehensive dilated eye exam including a refraction assessment and an eye health exam is used to diagnose presbyopia. Someone with presbyopia would have a near point of accommodation, or point at which an eye can focus at a near distance, recessed beyond the usual reading distance. This would result in the eye's inability to focus on images at reading distance or closer. Evaluating eye health for co-morbidities including cataracts, glaucoma, macular degeneration, or dry eye disease while diagnosing presbyopia can also help providers tailor presbyopia treatment to be more effective. Evaluating both the front and back of the eye involves utilizing slit-lamp biomicroscopy and ophthalmoscopy. Presbyopia can be categorized into mild, moderate, and advanced phases based on the level of correction required for maintained near vision. Mild presbyopia is typically seen in people 40–45 years old with an increase in +0.75 to +1.25 diopters of correction for near vision. Moderate presbyopia is typically seen in people 46–55 years old with an increase in +1.5 to +2.25 diopters. Advanced presbyopia is typically seen in people over 55 years old with a need for a +2.5 or greater correction for near vision.

A common differential diagnosis is accommodative insufficiency, a disorder that causes difficulties in near vision unrelated to the aging process. Accommodative insufficiency is caused by a dysfunction in the accommodative response, or the reflex that controls the focusing power of the lens in the eye. Latent hyperopia, or uncorrected farsightedness, may also cause difficulties in near vision, especially as excessive accommodation of the lens leads to strain and fatigue of the eye. Other eye conditions affecting near vision include macular and retinal diseases, disease of the optic nerve, glaucoma, posterior subscapular cataracts, and astigmatism.

== Treatment ==
To treat presbyopia, different methods are used to compensate for the eyes' poor accommodation. Images captured by the eye are translated into electric signals that are transmitted to the brain where they are interpreted. Presbyopia can be addressed in two components of the visual system, either improving the capturing of images by the eyes, or (in principle) image processing in the brain. Eye treatments include corrective lenses, eye drops, and surgery.

=== Eyeglasses ===
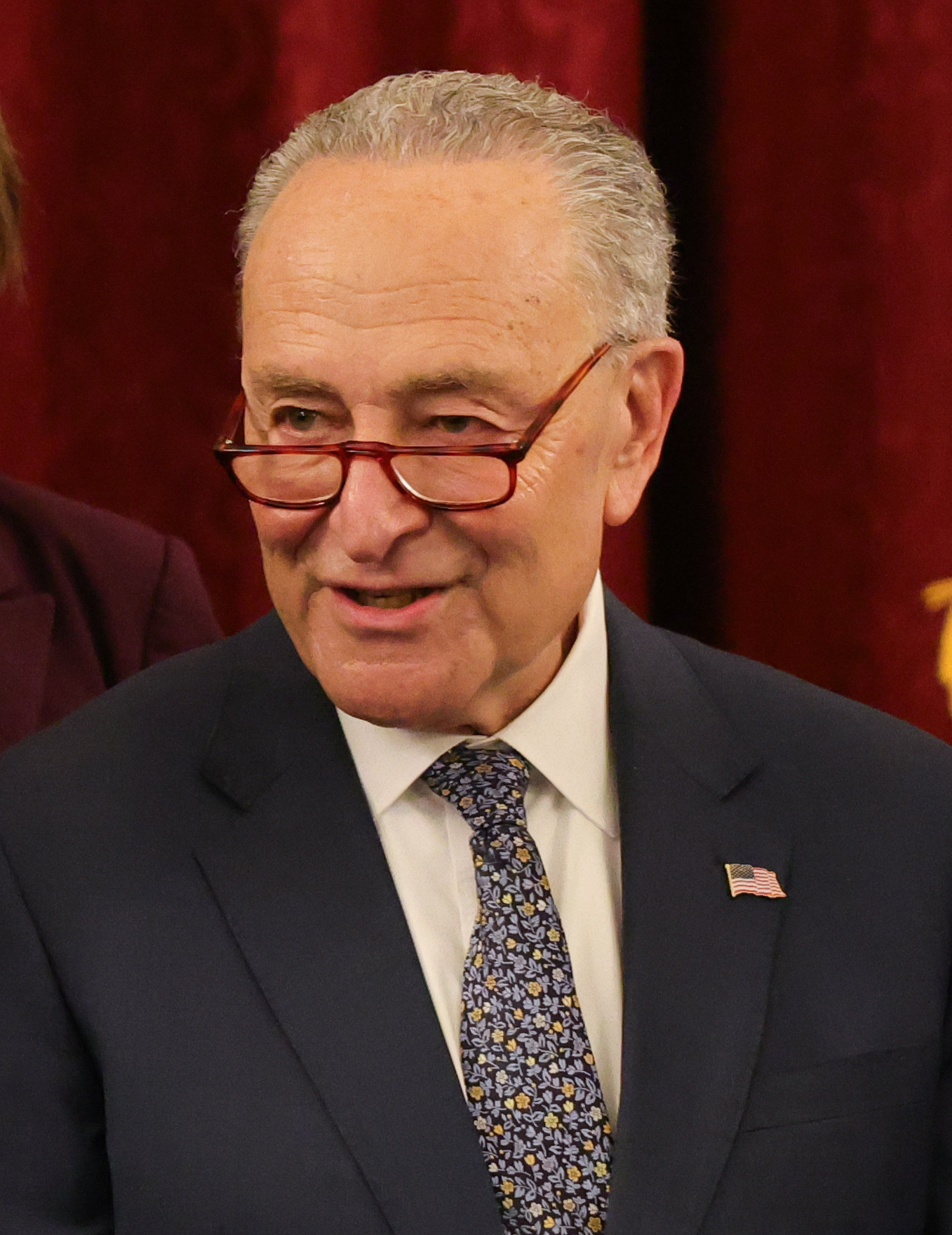
U.S. Senator Chuck Schumer is known for having a specific way of wearing his presbyopia eyeglasses

Corrective lenses provide vision correction over a range as high as +4.0 diopters. People with presbyopia require a convex lens for reading glasses; specialized preparations of convex lenses usually require the services of an optometrist. If an individual with presbyopia already has an existing prescription for nearsightedness, farsightedness, or astigmatism, other forms of corrective lens can be used. These include bifocals, which are lenses that has an individual's distance prescription for nearsightedness above the midline, and an individual's reading prescription for farsightedness or presbyopia below the midline. Trifocals can also be used for a combination of corrections in a similar manner as bifocals, but with a middle distance prescription in between the distance and close up vision prescription. Progressive lenses seamlessly blend distance, middle, and near vision prescriptions at different points of the lens.

=== Contact lenses ===
Contact lenses can also be used to correct the focusing loss that comes along with presbyopia. Similarly to bifocal eyeglasses, bifocal contact lenses can be used to provide distance and near vision correction. Each bifocal contact lens is weighted on the bottom to keep the distance and near vision in alignment with the movement of the eye. Multifocal contact lenses can be used to correct vision for both the near and the far with multiple prescriptions integrated into one lens. Some people choose contact lenses to correct one eye for near and one eye for far with a method called monovision. Modified versions of monovision contact lenses, in which one eye is corrected for either near or far vision and the other eye has a multifocal lens, are also utilized in treatment.

=== Eye drops ===
Pilocarpine 1.25% ophthalmic solution, also known by brand names Qlosi and Vuity, is an eye drop medication that constricts the pupil, has been approved by the US FDA for presbyopia. Pilocarpine binds to muscarinic receptors in the eye, the pupillary sphincter muscle contracts and causes pupil constriction in the eye. Pupil constriction allows for an increase in focusing depth in the eyes and for an improvement in adaptability of the eyes to near vision, which drives the effectiveness of pilocarpine as a treatment for presbyopia. However, the effects of pilocarpine only last around 6–10 hours, with potential side effects of headache, brow discomfort, and diminished night vision.

Research on other drugs is in progress. UNR844, a lipoic acid choline ester intended to restore lens elasticity, is also being investigated for efficacy., although the results for this drug during testing led to it being discontinued due to a lack of effectiveness. Phentolamine, a drug that induces vasodilation in the eye and causes pupil constriction without engaging the ciliary muscle to prevent retinal traction, is also being investigated. Compounds of carbachol and brimonidine as well as aceclidine and brimonidine also show promise in effectiveness and safety for presbyopia treatment.

=== Surgery ===
One target of surgery for presbyopia is the cornea. Refractive surgery has been done to create multifocal corneas. Laser-assisted sub-epithelial keratectomy (LASIK) and photorefractive keratectomy (PRK) are types of laser refractive surgeries used to correct refractive errors. Traditionally, one eye is corrected for distant vision and the other for near vision. However, this may cause impairments in binocular vision and depth perception. PresbyLASIK, a type of multifocal corneal ablation LASIK procedure, may be used to correct presbyopia. Results are, however, more variable and some people have a decrease in visual acuity. Concerns with refractive surgeries for presbyopia include people's eyes changing with time. Other side effects of multifocal corneal ablation include postoperative glare, halos, ghost images, and monocular diplopia. Conductive keratoplasty is a surgical treatment that does not use lasers. Instead, it uses radiofrequency radiation to increase the curvature of the central cornea to improve refractive power of the cornea. However, effects are short lasting and this treatment is not a long-term solution. Intracorneal inlays are devices that are embedded in the cornea to create a pinhole effect in the vision, which improves depth of focus and near vision.

Lens implantation can also be used to replace affected presbyopic lenses in the eye. For those unable to receive correction through the cornea, this is the next surgical treatment available. This can be done through correcting on eye for near vision and the other for distance vision to achieve monovision. Multifocal phakic intraocular lenses can also a recent advancement that allow for maintenance of the native crystalline lens while also correcting for distant and close vision in each eye. Lenses with multifocal, trifocal, or extended depth of focus can also be implanted to improve presbyopia beyond monovision.

The sclera can also be treated to improve presbyopia by targeting the rigid ocular tissues around the ciliary body. Improving mobility of the cilia and diminishing stiffness of the sclera through scleral expansion treatments have been considered. However, repeatability, longevity and safety of these treatments is not confirmed.

=== Image processing in the brain ===
A number of studies have claimed improvements in near visual acuity by the use of training protocols based on perceptual learning and requiring the detection of briefly presented low-contrast Gabor stimuli; study participants with presbyopia were enabled to read smaller font sizes and to increase their reading speed.

== Epidemiology ==
As of 2015, the prevalence of presbyopia was at 24.9%, or 1.8 billion people globally. This is projected to increase to 2.1 billion people in 2030. While age is by definition the largest factor affecting prevalence of presbyopia, other factors have been seen to be associated with the condition. A greater prevalence of presbyopia has been seen in urban populations at 25-80%, while the prevalence of presbyopia in rural population varies between 25 and 67%. However, living in a rural area was associated with higher prevalence of uncorrected visual impairment. Women over 40 years old had a higher prevalence of presbyopia than men over 40 years old, hypothesized to be a result of differences in tasks performed and viewing distances rather than a physiological sex difference.

== Etymology ==
The term presbyopia derives from Ancient Greek: πρέσβυς, romanized: presbys, lit. 'old' and ὤψ, ōps, 'sight' (GEN ὠπός, ōpos).

== History ==
The condition was mentioned as early as the writings of Aristotle in the 4th century BC. Glass lenses first came into use for the problem in the late 13th century.

== See also ==
- Vuity
