= Sagitta (optics) =

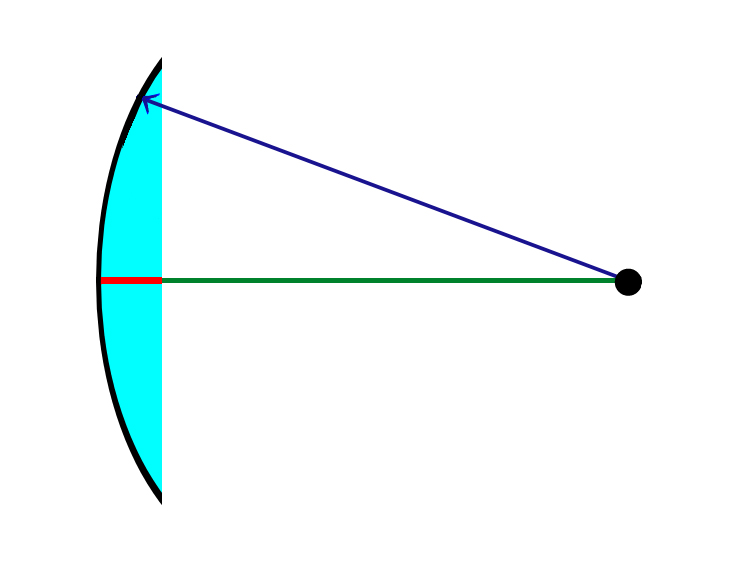
Deep blue ray refers the radius of curvature and the red line segment is the sagitta of the curve (black).

In optics and especially telescope making, sagitta or sag is a measure of the glass removed to yield an optical curve. It is approximated by the formula

$$S(r) \approx \frac{r^2}{2 \times R}$$,

where R is the radius of curvature of the optical surface. The sag S(r) is the displacement along the optic axis of the surface from the vertex, at distance $r$ from the axis.

A good explanation of both this approximate formula and the exact formula can be found here.

== Aspheric surfaces ==
Optical surfaces with non-spherical profiles, such as the surfaces of aspheric lenses, are typically designed such that their sag is described by the equation

$$S(r)=\frac{r^2}{R\left (1+\sqrt{1-(1+K)\frac{r^2}{R^2}}\right )}+\alpha_1 r^2+\alpha_2 r^4+\alpha_3 r^6+\cdots .$$

Here, $K$ is the conic constant as measured at the vertex (where $r=0$). The coefficients $\alpha_i$ describe the deviation of the surface from the axially symmetric quadric surface specified by $R$ and $K$.

== See also ==
- Versine
- Chord
