= Base curve radius =

Measure of a lens parameter in optometry

Base curve radius (BCR) or simply base curve (BC) is the measure of an important parameter of a lens in optometry. On a spectacle lens, it is the flatter curvature of the front surface. On a contact lens it is the curvature of the back surface and is sometimes referred to as the back central optic radius (BCOR). Typical values for a contact lens are from 8.0 to 10.0 mm. The base curve is the radius of the sphere of the back of the lens that the prescription describes (the lower the number, the steeper the curve of the cornea and the lens, the higher the number, the flatter the curve of the cornea and the lens). This number is important in order to allow the contact lens to fit well to the wearer's cornea for comfort, to facilitate tear exchange, and to allow oxygen transmission.

== See also ==
- Lens shape
- Radius of curvature (optics)
