= Dioptre =

Unit of measurement of optical power

dioptre
- Unit of: optical power
- Symbol: dpt, D

Conversions
1 dpt in ...	... is equal to ...
- SI units: 1 m^{−1}

Illustration of the relationship between optical power in dioptres and focal length in metres.

A dioptre (British spelling) or diopter (American spelling), symbol dpt or D, is a unit of measurement with dimension of reciprocal length, equivalent to one reciprocal metre, 1 dpt = 1 m^{−1}. It is normally used to express the optical power of a lens or curved mirror, which is a physical quantity equal to the reciprocal of the focal length, expressed in metres. For example, a 3-dioptre lens brings parallel rays of light to focus at 1/3 metre. A flat window has an optical power of zero dioptres, as it does not cause light to converge or diverge. Dioptres are also sometimes used for other reciprocals of distance, particularly radii of curvature and the vergence of optical beams.

The main benefit of using optical power rather than focal length is that the thin lens formula has the object distance, image distance, and focal length all as reciprocals. Additionally, when relatively thin lenses are placed close together, their powers approximately add. Thus, a thin 2.0-dioptre lens placed close to a thin 0.5-dioptre lens yields almost the same focal length as a single 2.5-dioptre lens.

The idea of numbering lenses based on the reciprocal of their focal length in metres was first suggested by Albrecht Nagel in 1866. The term dioptre was proposed by French ophthalmologist Ferdinand Monoyer in 1872, based on earlier use of the term dioptrice by Johannes Kepler.

== Name, symbol ==
Though the dioptre is based on the SI-metric system, it has not been included in the standard, so that there is no international name or symbol for this unit of measurement – within the international system of units, this unit for optical power would need to be specified explicitly as the inverse metre (m^{−1}). However most languages have borrowed the original name and some national standardization bodies like DIN specify a unit name (dioptrie, dioptria, etc.). In vision care, the symbol D is frequently used.

== In vision correction ==
The fact that optical powers are approximately additive enables an eye care professional to prescribe corrective lenses as a simple correction to the eye's optical power, rather than doing a detailed analysis of the entire optical system (the eye and the lens). Optical power can also be used to adjust a basic prescription for reading. Thus an eye care professional, having determined that a myopic (nearsighted) person requires a basic correction of, say, −2 dioptres to restore normal distance vision, might then make a further prescription of 'add 1' for reading, to make up for lack of accommodation (ability to alter focus). This is the same as saying that −1 dioptre lenses are prescribed for reading.

In humans, the total optical power of the relaxed eye is approximately 60 dioptres. The cornea accounts for approximately two-thirds of this refractive power (about 40 dioptres) and the crystalline lens contributes the remaining one-third (about 20 dioptres). In focusing, the ciliary muscle contracts to reduce the tension or stress transferred to the lens by the suspensory ligaments. This results in increased convexity of the lens which in turn increases the optical power of the eye. The amplitude of accommodation is about 11 to 16 dioptres at age 15, decreasing to about 10 dioptres at age 25, and to around 1 dioptre above age 60.

Convex lenses have positive dioptric value and are generally used to correct hyperopia (farsightedness) or to allow people with presbyopia (the limited accommodation of advancing age) to read at close range. Over the counter reading glasses are rated at +1.00 to +4.00 dioptres. Concave lenses have negative dioptric value and generally correct myopia (nearsightedness). Typical glasses for mild myopia have a power of −0.50 to −3.00 dioptres. Optometrists usually measure refractive error using lenses graded in steps of 0.25 dioptres.

Most mirrorless cameras and DSLRs have a control providing dioptre adjustment of the image seen through the viewfinder. The control is typically a small control wheel on the right or left side of the viewfinder.

== Curvature ==
The dioptre can also be used as a measurement of curvature equal to the reciprocal of the radius measured in metres. For example, a circle with a radius of 1/2 metre has a curvature of 2 dioptres. If the curvature of a surface of a lens is C and the index of refraction is n, the optical power of that surface is φ = (n − 1)C. For a curved mirror the optical power is φ = -2C.

== Relation to magnifying power ==
The magnifying power V of a simple magnifying glass is related to its optical power $\varphi$ by

$$V = 0.25\ \mathrm{m} \times \varphi + 1$$.

This is approximately the magnification observed when a person with normal vision holds the magnifying glass close to his or her eye.

== See also ==
- Astigmatism
- Dioptrics
- Lens clock
- Lensmeter
- Optics
- Optometry
- Prism correction § Prism dioptres
- Vertometer
- Visual acuity
