= Optical power =

Degree to which an optical system converges or diverges light

Illustration of the relationship between optical power in dioptres and focal length in metres

In optics, optical power (also referred to as dioptric power, refractive power, focal power, focusing power, or convergence power) is the degree to which a lens, mirror, or other optical system converges or diverges light. It is equal to the reciprocal of the focal length of the device; high optical power corresponds to short focal length. The SI unit for optical power is the inverse metre (m^{−1}), which is also called a dioptre (symbol: dpt or D) when used as a unit of optical power.

== Explanation ==
The optical power P of a device is related to its focal length f by P = 1/f.

Converging lenses have positive optical power, while diverging lenses have negative power. When a lens is immersed in a refractive medium, its optical power and focal length change.

For two or more thin lenses close together, the optical power of the combined lenses is approximately equal to the sum of the optical powers of each lens: P = P_{1} + P_{2}. Similarly, the optical power of a single lens is roughly equal to the sum of the powers of each surface. These approximations are commonly used in optometry.

An eye that has too much or too little refractive power to focus light onto the retina has a refractive error. A myopic eye has too much power so light is focused in front of the retina. This is noted as a minus power. Conversely, a hyperopic eye has too little power so when the eye is relaxed, light is focused behind the retina. An eye with a refractive power in one meridian that is different from the refractive power of the other meridians has astigmatism. This is also known as a cylindrical power. Anisometropia is the condition in which one eye has a different refractive power than the other eye.

== See also ==
- Accommodation of the eye
- Lens clock
- Lensmeter
- Plate scale
- Vergence
- Vertometer
