= Astigmatism =

Aberration of vision due to asymmetry in the eye's lens or cornea

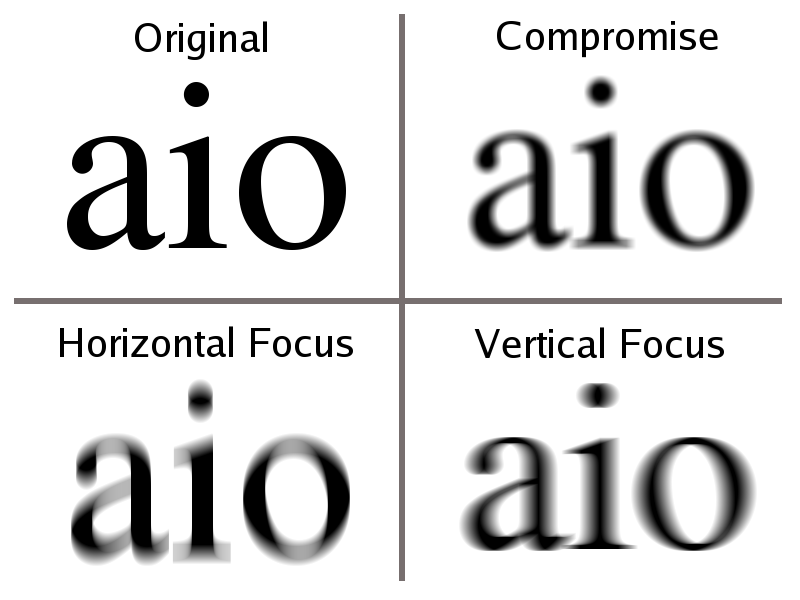
- Blur from astigmatic lens at different distances
- Specialty: Ophthalmology, optometry
- Symptoms: Distorted or blurred vision at all distances, eyestrain, and headaches
- Complications: Amblyopia
- Causes: Unclear
- Diagnostic method: Eye exam
- Treatment: Glasses, contact lenses, surgery
- Frequency: 30% to 60% of adults (Eurasia)

Astigmatism is a vision problem that occurs when the lens or cornea of an eye are slightly egg-shaped rather than spherical. The lack of rotational symmetry causes a refractive error that cannot be corrected with simple glasses. The astigmatism causes distorted or blurred vision at any distance and requires corrective lenses that apply different optical powers at different rotational angles. Astigmatism can lead to symptoms that include eyestrain, headaches, and trouble driving at night. Often it is present at birth, but it can change or develop later in life, and so can affect people of all ages. If it occurs in early life and is left untreated, it may result in amblyopia.

The cause of astigmatism is unclear, although it is believed to be partly genetic. The underlying mechanism involves an irregular curvature of the cornea and protective reaction changes in the lens of the eye, called lens astigmatism, that has the same mechanism as spasm of accommodation. Diagnosis is both objective (by an eye examination called autorefractor keratometry, which allows examination of the lenticular and corneal components of astigmatism) and subjective (by refraction).

Three treatment options are available: eyeglasses, contact lenses, and surgery. Glasses are the simplest. Contact lenses can provide a wider field of vision and fewer artifacts than even double aspheric eyeglass lenses. Refractive surgery aims to permanently change the shape of the eye and thereby cure astigmatism.

In Europe and Asia, astigmatism affects between 30% and 60% of adults. It was first reported by Thomas Young in 1801.

== Signs and symptoms ==
Although astigmatism can be asymptomatic, higher degrees of astigmatism may cause symptoms such as blurred vision, double vision, squinting, eye strain, fatigue, or headaches. Some research has pointed to the link between astigmatism and higher prevalence of migraine headaches.

== Causes ==
=== Congenital ===
The cause of congenital astigmatism is unclear, although it is believed to be partly related to genetic factors. Genetics, based on twin studies, appear to play only a small role in astigmatism as of 2007.

Genome-wide association studies (GWAS) have been used to investigate the genetic foundation of astigmatism. Although no conclusive result has been shown, various candidates have been identified. In a 2011 study of various Asian populations, variants in the PDGFRA gene on chromosome 4q12 were identified as associated with corneal astigmatism. A follow-up study in 2013 on the European population, however, found no variant significantly associated with corneal astigmatism at the genome-wide level (single-nucleotide polymorphism rs7677751 at PDGFRA). Facing the inconsistency, a study by Shah and colleagues in 2018 included both populations with Asian and Northern European ancestry. They successfully replicated the previously identified genome-wide significant locus for corneal astigmatism near the PDGFRA gene, with a further success of identifying three novel candidate genes: CLDN7, ACP2, and TNFAIP8L3. Other GWAS studies also provided inconclusive results: Lopes and colleagues identified a susceptibility locus with lead single nucleotide polymorphism rs3771395 on chromosome 2p13.3 in the VAX2 gene (VAX2 plays an important role in the development of the dorsoventral axis of the eye); Li and associates, however, found no consistent or strong genetic signals for refractive astigmatism while suggesting a possibility of widespread genetic co-susceptibility for spherical and astigmatic refractive errors. They also found that the TOX gene region previously identified for spherical equivalent refractive error was the second most strongly associated region. Another recent follow-up study again had identified four novel loci for corneal astigmatism, with two also being novel loci for astigmatism: ZC3H11B (associated with axial length), NPLOC4 (associated with myopia), LINC00340 (associated with spherical equivalent refractive error) and HERC2 (associated with eye color).

=== Acquired ===
Astigmatism may also occur following a cataract surgery or a corneal injury. Contraction of the scar due to wound or cataract extraction causes astigmatism due to flattening of the cornea in one direction. In keratoconus, progressive thinning and steepening of the cornea cause irregular astigmatism.

== Pathophysiology ==
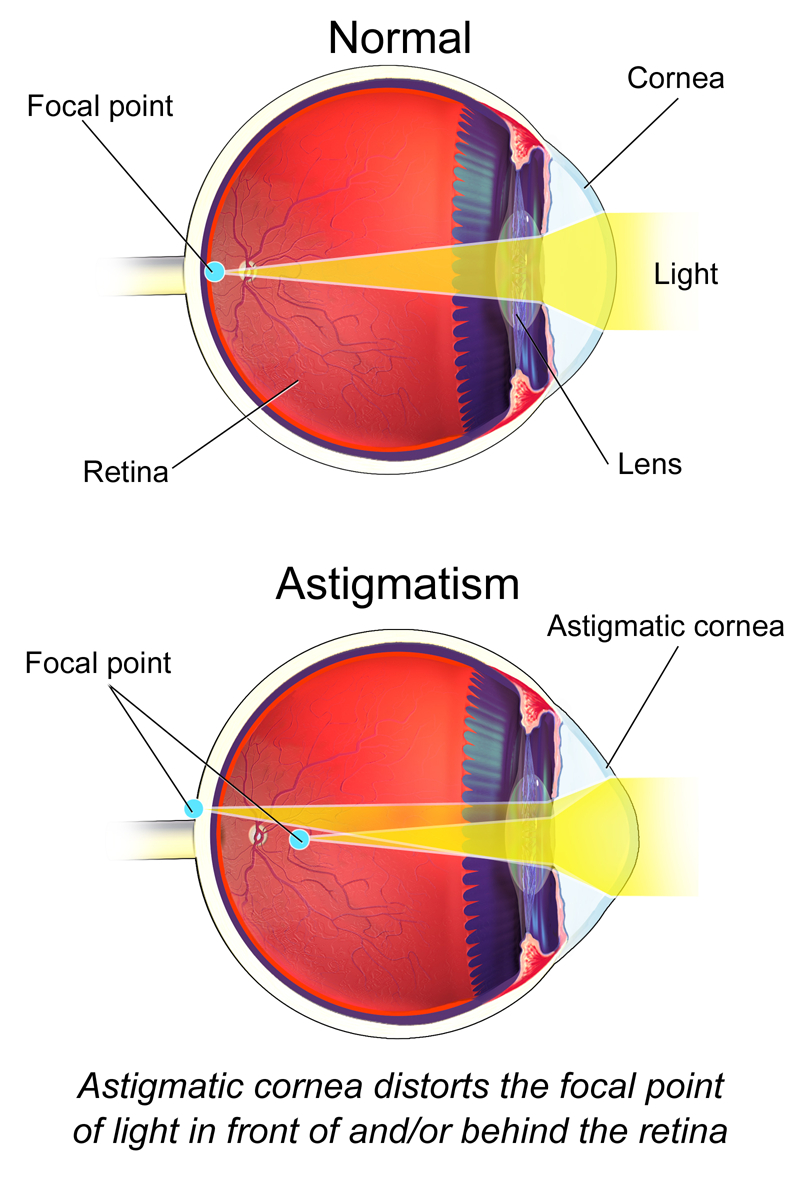
Illustration of astigmatism

=== Axes of the principal meridians ===
In eyes without astigmatism, the lens and cornea are spherical in shape. An astigmatic eye can be described by defining principal meridians, which are the steepest and flattest axes of the eye. There are several types of astigmatism, depending on the orientation of the principal meridians:

- Regular astigmatism – the principal meridians are perpendicular to one another.
  - With-the-rule astigmatism – the vertical meridian is steepest, and the cornea is wider than it is tall (a rugby ball or American football lying on its side).
  - Against-the-rule astigmatism – the horizontal meridian is steepest, and the cornea is taller than it is wide (a rugby ball or American football standing on its end).
  - Oblique astigmatism – the steepest curve lies in between 120 and 150 degrees and 30 and 60 degrees.
- Irregular astigmatism – the principal meridians are not perpendicular to one another.

In with-the-rule astigmatism, the eye has too much "plus" cylinder in the horizontal axis relative to the vertical axis (i.e., the eye is too "steep" along the vertical meridian relative to the horizontal meridian). Vertical beams of light focus in front (anterior) to horizontal beams of light, in the eye. This problem may be corrected using spectacles which have a "minus" cylinder placed on this horizontal axis. The effect of this will be that when a vertical beam of light in the distance travels towards the eye, the "minus" cylinder (which is placed with its axis lying horizontally – meaning in line with the patient's horizontal meridian relative to the excessively steep vertical meridian) will cause this vertical beam of light to slightly "diverge", or "spread out vertically", before it reaches the eye. This compensates for the fact that the patient's eye converges light more powerfully in the vertical meridian than the horizontal meridian, ideally allowing all light to be focused on the retina so that the patient's vision will be less blurred.

In against-the-rule astigmatism, a plus cylinder is added in the horizontal axis (or a minus cylinder in the vertical axis).

Axis is always recorded as an angle in degrees, between 0 and 180 degrees in a counter-clockwise direction. Both 0 and 180 degrees lie on a horizontal line at the level of the center of the pupil, and as seen by an observer, 0 lies on the right of both the eyes.

Irregular astigmatism, which is often associated with prior ocular surgery or trauma, is also a common naturally occurring condition. The two steep hemimeridians of the cornea, 180° apart in regular astigmatism, may be separated by less than 180° in irregular astigmatism (called nonorthogonal irregular astigmatism); and/or the two steep hemimeridians may be asymmetrically steep—that is, one may be significantly steeper than the other (called asymmetric irregular astigmatism). Irregular astigmatism is quantified by a vector calculation called topographic disparity.

=== Focus of the principal meridian ===
With accommodation relaxed:

- Simple astigmatism
  - Simple hyperopic astigmatism – first focal line is on the retina, while the second is located behind the retina.
  - Simple myopic astigmatism – first focal line is in front of the retina, while the second is on the retina.
- Compound astigmatism
  - Compound hyperopic astigmatism – both focal lines are located behind the retina.
  - Compound myopic astigmatism – both focal lines are located in front of the retina.
- Mixed astigmatism – focal lines are on both sides of the retina (straddling the retina).

=== Throughout the eye ===
Astigmatism, whether it is regular or irregular, is caused by some combination of external (corneal surface) and internal (posterior corneal surface, human lens, fluids, retina, and eye-brain interface) optical properties. In some people, the external optics may have the greater influence, and in other people, the internal optics may predominate. Importantly, the axes and magnitudes of external and internal astigmatism do not necessarily coincide, but it is the combination of the two that by definition determines the overall optics of the eye. The overall optics of the eye are typically expressed by a person's refraction; the contribution of the external (anterior corneal) astigmatism is measured through the use of techniques such as keratometry and corneal topography. One method analyzes vectors for planning refractive surgery such that the surgery is apportioned optimally between both the refractive and topographic components.

== Diagnosis ==
A number of tests are used during eye examinations to determine the presence of astigmatism and to quantify its amount and axis. A Snellen chart or other eye charts may initially reveal reduced visual acuity. A keratometer may be used to measure the curvature of the steepest and flattest meridians in the cornea's front surface. Corneal topography may also be used to obtain a more accurate representation of the cornea's shape. An autorefractor or retinoscopy may provide an objective estimate of the eye's refractive error and the use of Jackson cross cylinders in a phoropter or trial frame may be used to subjectively refine those measurements. An alternative technique with the phoropter requires the use of a "clock dial" or "sunburst" chart to determine the astigmatic axis and power. A keratometer may also be used to estimate astigmatism by finding the difference in power between the two primary meridians of the cornea. Javal's rule can then be used to compute the estimate of astigmatism.

A method of astigmatism analysis by Alpins may be used to determine both how much surgical change of the cornea is needed and after surgery to determine how close treatment was to the goal.

Another rarely used refraction technique involves the use of a stenopaeic slit (a thin slit aperture) where the refraction is determined in specific meridians. This technique is particularly useful in cases where the patient has a high degree of astigmatism or in refracting patients with irregular astigmatism.

=== Classification ===
There are three primary types of astigmatism: myopic astigmatism, hyperopic astigmatism, and mixed astigmatism. Cases can be classified further, such as regular or irregular and lenticular or corneal.

== Treatment ==
Astigmatism may be corrected with eyeglasses, contact lenses, or refractive surgery (including laser surgery). Glasses are the simplest and safest, although contact lenses can provide a wider field of vision. Refractive surgery can eliminate the need to wear corrective lenses altogether by permanently changing the shape of the eye but, like all elective surgery, comes with both greater risk and expense than the non-invasive options. Various considerations involving eye health, refractive status, and lifestyle determine whether one option may be better than another. In those with keratoconus, certain contact lenses often enable patients to achieve better visual acuity than eyeglasses. Once only available in a rigid, gas-permeable form, toric lenses are now also available as soft lenses.

Common eyeglass prescriptions follow one of two conventions (both equivalent). For example, a cylindrical astigmatic correction of (−0.75 diopters at 45°) is equivalent to one of (+0.75 diopters at 135°).

In older people, astigmatism can also be corrected during cataract surgery. This can either be done by inserting a toric intraocular lens or by performing special incisions (limbal relaxing incisions). Toric intraocular lenses probably provide a better outcome with respect to astigmatism in these cases than limbal relaxing incisions.

Toric intraocular lenses can additionally be used in patients with complex ophthalmic history, such as previous ophthalmic surgery. In such complex cases, toric intraocular lenses seem to be as effective as in non-complex cases for correction of concurrent corneal astigmatism.

With advancement in laser science and the increasingly prevalent use of surgical laser systems in ophthalmology, laser eye surgery has become one of the most commonly used methods for treating astigmatism, with success rates among the highest of all the currently available treatment methods according to peer-reviewed research studies and comparative analyses.

== Epidemiology ==
The World Health Organization (WHO) reports that 2.2 billion people have vision impairment, with 88.4 million being related to refractive error. A compilation of many systematic reviews found that there was an 8-62% prevalence of astigmatism among adults, with an estimated prevalence of 40% worldwide. The country with the highest reported prevalence among the compilation of systematic reviews is China at 62%. The prevalence of astigmatism increases with age due to changes in refractive index gradients. According to an American study, nearly three in ten children (28.4%) between the ages of five and seventeen have astigmatism. A Brazilian study published in 2005 found that 34% of the students in one city were astigmatic.

Studies have shown that infants in their first few months have a high prevalence of astigmatism due to a steep cornea. The steepest corneas are found in infants with low birth weights and post-conceptional age. By the age of four, the prevalence of astigmatism has reduced as the cornea flattens. The cornea remains mostly stable during adulthood, and then steepens again in older adulthood (40+ years).

Mild astigmatism has a higher prevalence than moderate and significant astigmatisms and increased until the age of 70, while moderate and significant astigmatisms showed an increase in prevalence after the age of 70. Of the levels of astigmatism, mild astigmatism is most prevalent, making up about 82% of the total reported astigmatisms.

With-the-rule astigmatism (from studies with differing age groups) has a prevalence range of 4 to 98% globally. The prevalence range for against-the-rule astigmatism (from studies with differing age groups) is from 1 to 58%. For oblique astigmatism, the prevalence range is from 2 to 61%. With-the-rule astigmatism is more prevalent in young adults, and over time, the prevalence shifts to be mostly against-the-rule astigmatism. A Polish study published in 2005 revealed "with-the-rule astigmatism" may lead to the onset of myopia.

The main cause of astigmatism is changes in the curvature of the cornea. When left untreated, astigmatism causes people to have a lower vision-related quality of life. Some factors that lead to this are a decrease in vision quality and an increase in glare and haloes. People with astigmatism have more difficulty with night driving and can have a decreased productivity due to errors. However, there are many ways to help correct astigmatisms: The use of glasses or contacts, Toric intraocular lenses, Toric implantable Collamer lenses, and/or corneal refractive surgery have been shown to correct astigmatisms.

== History ==
As a student, Thomas Young discovered that he had problems with one eye in 1793. In the following years, he did research on his vision problems. He presented his findings in a Bakerian Lecture in 1801.

Independent from Young, George Biddell Airy discovered the phenomenon of astigmatism on his own eye. Airy presented his observations on his own eye in February 1825 at the Cambridge Philosophical Society. Airy produced lenses to correct his vision problems by 1825, while other sources put this into 1827 when Airy obtained cylindrical lenses from an optician from Ipswich. The name for the condition was given by William Whewell.

By the 1860s, astigmatism was a well established concept in ophthalmology, and chapters in books described the discovery of astigmatism.

In 1849, Irish English physicist and mathematician George Stokes invented Stokes lens to detect astigmatism. In 1887, American ophthalmologist Edward Jackson revised the Stokes lens concept and made a cross cylinder lens to refine power and axis of astigmatism. In 1907, Jackson described determination of the axis of a correcting cylinder in astigmatism using a cross cylinder.

== See also ==
- Near-sightedness
- Far-sightedness
