= ZC3H11B =

Protein-coding gene in humans

Identifiers
- Aliases: ZC3H11B, ZC3HDC11B, zinc finger CCCH-type containing 11B pseudogene, zinc finger CCCH-type containing 11B
- External IDs: GeneCards: ZC3H11B

Gene location (Human)
Chr.	Chromosome 1 (human)
Band	1q41	Start	219,608,010 bp
Band	1q41	End	219,613,145 bp
RNA expression pattern
Bgee	Human / Mouse (ortholog); Top expressed in: testicle; gonad; right testis; left testis; ventricular zone; ganglionic eminence; muscle of thigh; stromal cell of endometrium; left ventricle; gastrocnemius muscle / n/a; More reference expression data
BioGPS	n/a
Orthologs
Databases	NCBI: entry; OMA: entry
Species	Human	Mouse
Entrez	643136	n/a
Ensembl	ENSG00000215817	n/a
UniProt	n a	n/a
RefSeq (mRNA)	NM_001085394; NM_001355457	n/a
RefSeq (protein)	n/a	n/a
Location (UCSC)	Chr 1: 219.61 – 219.61 Mb	n/a
PubMed search		n/a
- Wikidata
View/Edit Human

ZC3H11B also known as zinc finger CCCH-type containing protein 11B is a protein in humans that is encoded by the ZC3H11B gene. The zc3h11b gene is located on chromosome 1, on the long arm, in band 4 section 1. This protein is also known as ZC3HDC11B. The zc3h11b gene is a total of 5,134 base pairs long, and the protein is 805 amino acids in length. The zc3h11b gene has 2 exons in total.

== Function ==
The ZC3H11B protein is expressed in various tissues including those of the testis, heart, leg, and adrenal. ZC3H11B is predicted to be involved in metal ion binding, a mechanism that involves combination of a metal ion or chelation, as inferred from Electronic Association.

== Structure ==
=== Domains ===
The ZC3H11B protein has three conserved domains. These include zinc finger domains, which are one of the most common or abundant protein groups often involved in regulation of cellular processes, and coiled coil domains, which are a structurally conserved protein group present in all domains of life often involved in molecular spacing, vesicle tethering, and DNA recognition and cleavage. Both the zinc finger and coiled coil domains are conserved in eukaryotes.

Zinc finger C3H1-type 1 is located from amino acids 2-29, and zinc finger C3H1-type 2 is located from amino acids 31–57. Zinc finger C3H1-type proteins have been identified to interact with 3' region of untranslated mRNAs. Coiled coil is located from positions 403-423 amino acids of the protein.

=== Secondary ===
Currently the secondary structure of ZC3H11B is unknown.

The predicted secondary structure of ZC3H11B is a loop secondary structure composition, which are irregular secondary structures that connect two secondary structural elements and are able to change the direction of polypeptide chain propagation. The loop is predicted to be exposed for binding.

=== Post-translational modifications ===
ZC3H11B is likely found in the nucleus. ZC3H11B is predicted to undergo various phosphorylations, O-GlcNAcylations, glycations, and O-glycosylations.

Example of sites predicted for phosphorylation, a mechanism in which a phosphoryl group is added and important in biological regulation and other cellular processes, occur on 108, 149, 196,229, 290, and 330. Example of sites predicted for O-GlcNAcylations, a mechanism in which an O-linked N-acetylglucosamine (O-GlcNAc) is added and important for regulation of cellular processes, are 488, 744, and 732. Examples of sites predicted for glycations, a mechanism in which glucose binds with proteins and lipids, are 140, 359, 669, and 776. Example of sites predicted for O-glycosylation, a mechanism in which sugars or monosaccharides add to hydroxyl groups of proteins, occur on 179 and 386.

== Homology ==
There are several identified homologs of the zc3h11b protein in a variety of species including various mammals, insects, and amphibians.

=== Paralogs ===
Currently, there is one paralog of ZC3H11B in the same CCCH-type zinc finger family based on BLAST analysis (NCBI).

Name	Species	NCBI accession number	Length (AA)	Protein identity
ZC3H11A	H. sapiens	NP_001306167.1	810	93.29%

C12orf50 (H. sapiens) has also been predicted as a paralog of ZC3H11B.

=== Orthologs ===
There are several species that have been found as having orthologs to the zc3h11b protein in their genome based on BLAST analysis (NCBI).

Name	Species	NCBI accession number	Length (AA)	Protein identity
ZC3H11A	P. troglodytes	XP_016791924.1	810	93.29%
ZC3H11A	M. mulatta	NP_001247891.1	810	92.67%
ZC3H11A	C. lupus	XP_022271137.1	815	84.34%
ZC3H11A	F. catus	XP_006942949.1	816	83.60%
ZC3H11A	E. caballus	NP_001295209.1	815	83.70%

ZC3H11A (B. Taurus), Zc3h11a (M. musculus), Zc3h11a (R. norvegicus), ZC3H11A (G. gallus), zc3h11a, (X. tropicalis), zc3h11a (D. rerio), AT2G02160 (A. thaliana), ZC3H11A (M. domesticia), zc3h11a (A. carolinensis), and ZC3H11A (S. scrofa) have also been predicted as orthologs of ZC3H11B.

== Clinical significance ==
Current research has identified ZC3H11B as single-nucleotide polymorphisms (SNPs) that are the most common genetic variation among groups with high myopia and corneal astigmatism. As of April 2020, there have been no other published association studies linking ZC3H11B with other conditions.

=== Myopia ===
Myopia, also known as shortsightedness or nearsightedness, is a condition caused by a refractive error in which the shape of the eye is either elongated or the cornea is too curved. In developed countries, this condition occurs in over 50% of the population with a high rate of occurrence among adults (80-90%) in East Asia and occurs approximately in 30% of the population in the United States.

Myopia is categorized in two groups. The first of which comprises people with low to medium amount of myopia, or simple myopia, and is diagnosed at 0 to -6 diopters and is treated with corrective lenses. The second is classified as high myopia and is diagnosed at greater than -6 diopters and typically are found in cases of retinal detachment, macular degeneration, and glaucoma. Myopia is considered as one of the leading causes of blindness and visual impairment in the world by the World Health Organization.

An elongated ocular axial length (AL), or distance from the anterior corneal surface to the retinal pigment epithelium, is a determinant of the development of myopia. A genome-wide association study conducted in a population of Chinese adults and children as well as Malay adults identified that ZC3H11B is associated with AL and high myopia. There were ZC3H11B mRNA expression levels in the brain, placenta, neural retina, retina pigment epithelium, and sclera with a greater decrease in quantity or down-regulated expression levels in myopic eyes than non-myopic eyes. This identification was confirmed in another genome-wide association study along with the identification of additional significant loci for AL of RSPO1 (involved in Wnt signaling or regulation of eyeball size), C3orf26, ZNRF3 (involved in Wnt signaling), and ALPPL2. Thus, this identification of shared association AL genes indicates that AL and refraction may be caused by different optic pathways. Additionally, a genome-wide association study in Chinese populations confirmed that ZC3H11B is a susceptibility gene for the development of high and extreme myopia.

=== Astigmatism ===
An astigmatism is a condition in which the curvature of the cornea or lens is abnormal. Astigmatisms can be classified as corneal astigmatism in which the corneal shape is irregular, lenticular astigmatism in which the lens shape is irregular, or refractive astigmatism. Astigmatism is typically treated with corrective lenses or surgery (such as LASIK).

Refractive and corneal astigmatism may lead to the development of amblyopia, or lazy eye, if left untreated. A genome-wide association study of individuals of European ancestry identified the ZC3H11B gene as significant for corneal astigmatism. Additionally, there were two other loci were identified to demonstrate genome-wide significant association for corneal astigmatism, HERC2 and TSPAN10/NPLOC4.
