= Phosducin family =

The phosducin family is a group of proteins primarily known for their role in regulating heterotrimeric G-protein signaling. These proteins are found in various tissues, with notable expression in the retina and nervous system. Phosducin proteins are involved in modulating signal transduction by interacting with the G-protein beta-gamma (Gβγ) complex, thereby influencing multiple physiological processes.

== Structure and classification ==
Phosducins are small, cytosolic proteins characterized by a conserved phosducin-like domain, which facilitates their interaction with G-proteins. The family is broadly classified into:

1. Phosducin (PDC): Expressed predominantly in retinal photoreceptor cells, PDC regulates visual signal transduction.
2. Phosducin-like proteins (PhLPs): A subset of phosducins, including PhLP1, PhLP2, and PhLP3, which have diverse roles beyond vision, such as protein folding and cellular signaling.

== Functional roles ==
=== 1. G-Protein regulation ===
Phosducins interact with the Gβγ subunits of heterotrimeric G-proteins, acting as modulators of G-protein-coupled receptor signaling. This interaction affects downstream pathways, including vision, neurotransmission, and hormonal signaling.

=== 2. Role in vision ===
In retinal photoreceptors, phosducin binds to the Gβγ complex, regulating phototransduction. Under bright light conditions, phosducin is phosphorylated, leading to the release of Gβγ and allowing the resensitization of photoreceptors.

=== 3. Protein folding and chaperone function ===
Some PhLPs, such as PhLP2 and PhLP3, function as co-chaperones in the CCT/TRiC chaperonin complex, assisting in the proper folding of actin and tubulin.

=== 4. Neurotransmission and hormonal regulation ===
Beyond the retina, phosducins are expressed in the brain and endocrine tissues, where they influence neurotransmitter release and hormone signaling.

== Phosphorylation and regulation ==
Phosducin activity is regulated by phosphorylation through protein kinases such as protein kinase A and protein kinase C. When phosphorylated, phosducin loses its ability to bind Gβγ, altering downstream signaling dynamics.

== Implications in disease and therapeutics ==
Dysregulation of phosducin proteins has been linked to several diseases, including:

- Retinal disorders: Mutations or alterations in phosducin expression contribute to photoreceptor degeneration.
- Neurological disorders: PhLP dysfunction is associated with neurodegenerative diseases due to its role in protein folding.
- Cardiovascular regulation: Phosducin influences blood pressure by modulating sympathetic nervous system activity

== Human proteins containing this domain ==
| Gene | Aliases | Protein |
|---|---|---|
| PDC | MEKA | phosducin |
| PDCL | PhLP1 | phosducin-like |
| PDCL2 | GCPHLP | phosducin-like 2 |
| PDCL3 | PhLP2A | phosducin-like 3 |
| TXNDC9 | PhLP3 | thioredoxin domain containing 9 |

- The article need two subjects to be added PDCL2 and PDCL3 as separate article.
This article incorporates text from the public domain Pfam and InterPro: IPR001200
