= Edward Jackson (ophthalmologist) =

American ophthalmologist (1856–1942)

- Born: 30 March 1856; West Goshen Township, Pennsylvania, United States
- Died: 20 October 1942 (aged 86)
- Education: Union College, New York; University of Pennsylvania
- Known for: Jackson cross cylinder
- Scientific career
- Fields: Ophthalmology
- Workplaces: University of Colorado School of Medicine Penn Medicine Rittenhouse Wills Eye Hospital

Edward Jackson (March 30, 1856 - October 29, 1942) was an American ophthalmologist better known for popularizing retinoscopy in the United States. He also described detecting astigmatism and its correct axis using a cross-cylinder. The modified Stokes lens he made was later known as Jackson's cross-cylinder.

== Biography ==
Edward Jackson was born March 30, 1856, in West Goshen Township, Pennsylvania, the son of Holiday and Emily Jackson. He completed his Bachelor of Science in Civil Engineering from Union College, New York in 1874, and in 1878 received his medical degree from the University of Pennsylvania.

Jackson married Jenny L. Price in 1878. After she died in 1896, he settled in Denver in 1898, where he married Emily Churchman.

Jackson died of heart block on October 29, 1942, at the age of 86.

== Career ==
Jackson, who served as Professor of Ophthalmology at the Penn Medicine Rittenhouse (previously Philadelphia Polyclinic) and surgeon at Wills Eye Hospital later became professor and chairman of the Department of Ophthalmology at the University of Colorado School of Medicine. He founded the Colorado Ophthalmological Society and started the first postgraduate course in ophthalmology in the US.

In 1885, he popularized retinoscopy in the United States. In 1887 he described detecting astigmatism using a cross-cylinder, and in 1907 he described the determination of the axis of a correcting cylinder in astigmatism using a cross-cylinder. The modified Stokes lens was later known as Jackson's cross-cylinder.

He founded and edited the Yearbook of Ophthalmology and Ophthalmic Literature, and was appointed editor of the third series of the American Journal of Ophthalmology in 1918. He held several other positions including president of the American Academy of Ophthalmology and Otolaryngology and member of American Board of Ophthalmology.

== Awards and honors ==
In honor of him, the American Academy of Ophthalmology annually conducts a Jackson Memorial Lecture.
