= Stokes lens =

Ophthalmic lens

- Synonyms: Stokes' lens
- Test of: Astigmatism

Stokes lens, also known as variable power cross cylinder lens, is a lens used to diagnose a type of refractive error known as astigmatism.

== Lens design ==
The Stokes lens, also known as variable power cross cylinder lens, in its standard version, is a lens combination consisting of equal but opposite (one plano-convex and other plano-concave) power cylindrical lenses attached together in a way so that the lenses can be rotated in opposite directions. When the axes are parallel, the two powers cancel each other out to achieve the resulting power zero; when the axes are at right angles, a sphero-cylindrical lens with maximum power is obtained.

== Uses ==
Stokes lens is a lens used to diagnose and measure astigmatism.

== Adaptations ==
American ophthalmologist Edward Jackson revised the Stokes lens concept and made a cross cylinder lens to refine power and axis of astigmatism. This lens combination is known as Jackson cross cylinder. Based on the Stokes lens, James P. Foley and Charles E. Campbell made a variable power astigmatic lens which is combination of two identical cylindrical powers instead of equal and opposite powers.

== History ==
In 1837, English mathematician and astronomer George Biddell Airy invented the cylindric lens and used it to correct astigmatism. Irish English physicist and mathematician George Stokes invented the Stokes lens in 1849.
