= C3orf62 =

Protein

Identifiers
- Aliases: C3orf62, chromosome 3 open reading frame 62, MAPS
- External IDs: MGI: 2148248; GeneCards: C3orf62

Gene location (Human)
Chr.	Chromosome 3 (human)
Band	3p21.31	Start	49,268,596 bp
Band	3p21.31	End	49,277,232 bp

Gene location (Mouse)
Chr.	Chromosome 9 (mouse)
Band	9|9 F2	Start	108,270,004 bp
Band	9|9 F2	End	108,288,133 bp
RNA expression pattern
Bgee	Human / Mouse (ortholog); Top expressed in: left testis; right testis; blood; right adrenal cortex; granulocyte; left ovary; gonad; right ovary; left adrenal gland; left adrenal cortex / Top expressed in: spermatocyte; seminiferous tubule; spermatid; embryo; embryo; granulocyte; morula; neural layer of retina; yolk sac; muscle of thigh; More reference expression data
BioGPS	n/a
Orthologs
Databases	NCBI: entry; OMA: entry
Species	Human	Mouse
Entrez	375341	112418
Ensembl	ENSG00000188315	ENSMUSG00000032611
UniProt	Q6ZUJ4	Q9D9C7
RefSeq (mRNA)	NM_198562	NM_053216
RefSeq (protein)	NP_940964	NP_444446
Location (UCSC)	Chr 3: 49.27 – 49.28 Mb	Chr 9: 108.27 – 108.29 Mb
PubMed search
- Wikidata
View/Edit Human	View/Edit Mouse

C3orf62

Identifiers
- Symbol: C3orf62
- Alt. names: CC062, FLJ43654
- NCBI gene: 375341
- HGNC: 24771
- RefSeq: NM_198562.21
- UniProt: Q6ZUJ4

Other data
- Locus: Chr. 3 p21.31{{{LocusSupplementaryData}}}
Search for
- Structures: Swiss-model
- Domains: InterPro

Chromosome 3 open reading frame 62 (C3orf62) is a protein that in humans is encoded by the C3orf62 gene. C3orf62 is a glycine-depleted protein relative to the amount of glycine in proteins in the rest of the genome. C3orf62 has a KKXX-like motif and is predicted to be localized in the nucleus. Expression of C3orf62 remains highest in whole blood.

== Gene ==
=== Locus ===
C3orf62 is mapped to the reverse strand of chromosome 3 at 3p21.31 and spans 9,313 bases. C3orf62 starts at 49,268,597 base pairs from the terminus of the short arm (pter) and ending at 49,277,909 base pairs pter. This gene is known to have 3 exons, 4 transcripts, and 37 orthologues.

=== Gene neighborhood ===
C3orf62 is flanked by Ubiquitin Specific Protease 4 (USP4) and Coil-Coiled Domain Containing 36 (CCDC36).

C3orf62 and its gene neighbors on chromosome 3 from NCBI

=== Aliases ===
C3orf62 possesses the following alternate names and synonyms: CC062; FLJ43654.

== Protein ==
=== Primary sequence ===
C3orf62 human protein (Q6ZUJ4) is 267 amino acids long, and has a molecular mass of 30,194 daltons. The isoelectric point of C3orf62 is roughly 5.2. The unmodified C3orf62 protein is a “glycine depleted protein” relative to amounts of glycine in proteins in the rest of the genome. It appears that glycine is evenly distributed throughout the C3orf62 sequence with no preference of areas to cluster in. Before post-translational modifications, C3orf62 is an acidic protein. No charge clusters are present in C3orf62, and no specific spacing of cysteine is found. The isoelectric point of C3orf62 is 5.211000.

Name	Ensembl Transcript ID	Base Pairs	Protein	Biotype	CCDS	Uniprot	Refseq
C3orf62-001	ENST00000343010.7	4235	267aa	Protein encoding	CCDS2792	Q6ZUJ4	NM_198562, NP_940964
C3orf62-004	ENST00000436325.1	581	190aa	Protein encoding	-	C9JW57	-
C3orf62-003	ENST00000424960.1	602	98aa	Nonsense mediated decay	-	H7BZX3	-
C3orf62-002	ENST00000479673.1	3330	No protein	Retained intron	-	-	-

=== Domains and motifs ===
There are no known transmembrane domains for C3orf62. C3orf62 has a KKXX-like motif in the C-terminus meaning C3orf62 may be responsible for retrieval of endoplasmic reticulum (ER) membrane proteins from the Golgi apparatus.

=== Secondary structure ===
Roughly 7 alpha helices are predicted for C3orf62 through Pele Protein Structure Protein Prediction and strengthened through orthologous secondary structure predictions by Ali2D.

=== Subcellular localization ===
C3orf62 is predicted to be localized in the nucleus. The k-nearest neighbors algorithm predicts C3orf62 to be classified as follows: k=9/23; 69.6% nuclear, 13.0% mitochondrial, 13.0% cytoskeletal, 4.3% cytoplasmic.

=== Expression ===
C3orf62 is expressed in more than 30 different tissues; highest expression is in whole blood. Specifically, highest expression of C3orf62 is in the following tissues: lung, tonsil, trachea, small intestine, mammary gland, and salivary gland. Through analysis of various microarray studies, C3orf62 is found to have consistently high expression compared to other genes tested in the datasets. C3orf62 has low expression in brain tissues.

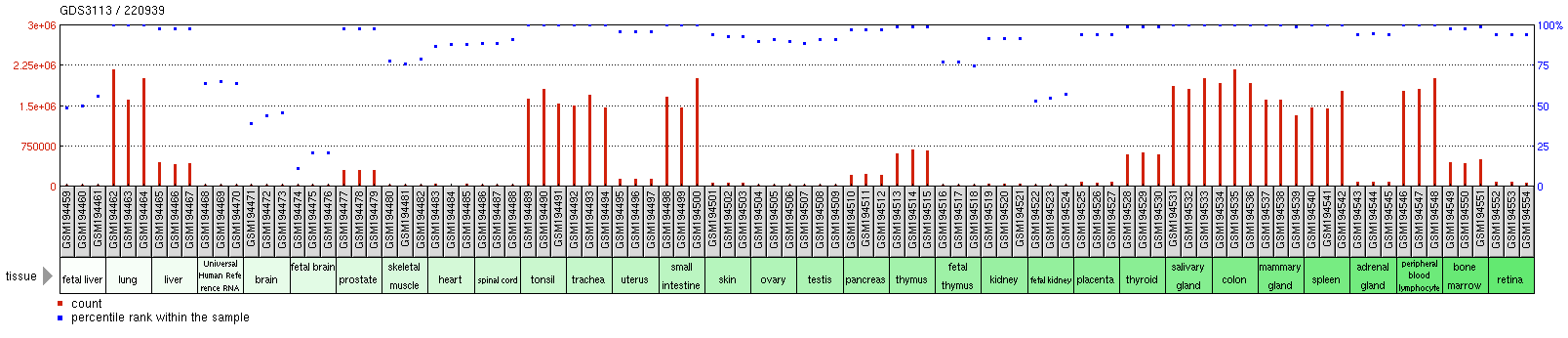
Diagram depicting the expression of C3orf62 in tissues throughout the body

=== Post-translational modifications ===
C3orf62 possesses two post-translational modifications, both are phosphorylation sites with locations at amino acid 210 and 224. A natural variant is found at amino acid 110 (Glutamic acid (E)--> Lysine K).

It appears as though C3orf62 may have a YinOYang site at residue 115, meaning that this Threonine residue is predicted to be O-GlycNAcylated as well as phosphorylated. This site may be reversibly and dynamically modified by O-GlcNAc or Phosphate groups at different times in the cell.

== Regulation of expression ==
Thirteen promoters have been predicted for C3orf62.

== Transcript variants ==
Transcription of C3orf62 produces 5 alternatively spliced variants and 1 unspliced form. Of the four splice variants, two of them are protein coding, one is nonsense meditated decay, and one is a retained intron. QIAGEN denotes the following as transcription factor binding sites in the C3orf62 promoter: TFCP2, Pax-6, p53, MyoD, YY1, Ik-2, AREB6, IRF-7A3.

== Function ==
Function of C3orf62 is not currently understood by the scientific community.

=== Interactions ===
Upwards of 12 interacting proteins have been predicted for C3orf62. Interacting proteins with the strongest confidence to interact with C3orf62 include: HAUS augmin-like complex subunit 1 (HAUS-1), Inhibitor of growth protein 5 (ING5), Thioredoxin domain-containing protein 9 (TXNDC9), and MORF4-family associated proteins (MORF4L1, MFRAP1).

Chemicals known to interact with C3orf62 include the following: Aflatoxin B1, Hydralazine, Valproic acid, and Decitabine.

=== Clinical significance ===
Interstitial deletions of chromosome 3 are rare, and only a few patients with a microdeletion of 3p21.31 have been reported to date. Characteristic clinical features found in patients with a microdeletion of 3p21.31 include developmental delay and distinctive facial features (including arched eyebrows, hypertelorism, epicanthus, and micrognathia).

In the gene region, NCBI SNP identified 1,326 SNPS on the reverse minus strand of C3orf62. In the coding region, NCBI SNP identified 147 common SNPs.

== Homology ==
=== Paralogs ===
There are no known paralogs of C3orf62.

=== Orthologs ===
The ortholog space of C3orf62 is fairly narrow, with the majority of orthologs found in mammals. A small fraction of orthologs have also been found in the following classes: Reptila, Sarcopterygii, and Actinoptergii.

The groupings of nearly all Mammalia ortholog sequences of C3orf62 are as follows: E-value: 2e-94 to 1e-169; similarity 56-84%. Mammals in this group consist largely of primates but also include the following orders: Perissodactyla, Rodentia, Carnivora, Proboscidea, Cetartiodactyla, Cingulata, Artiodactyla, Eulipotyphla, Diselphimorphia, and Afrosoricida.

More distantly related ortholog sequences of C3orf62 include organisms from classes Reptilia, Sarcopterygii, and Actinopterygii ranging from an E-value of 8e-10 to 3e-59 with similarity of 24-39%. Organisms in this grouping consist of Testudines, Coelacanthiformes, Squamata, and Osteoglossiformes orders. No ortholog sequences of C3orf62 were found for the following life forms: Bacteria, archaea, protist, plant, fungus, trichoplax, invertebrate, amphibian, or bird.

Genus and species	Common name	Class	Accession	Percent identity
Homo sapiens	Human	Mammalia	NP_940964	100
Microcebus murinus	Grey Mouse Lemur	Mammalia	XP_012626718	88
Propithecus coquereli	Coquerel's sifaka (lemur)	Mammalia	XP_012510880	86.9
Equus caballus	Horse	Mammalia	NP_001295877	84.3
Loxodonta Africana	African elephant	Mammalia	XP_003409711	83.2
Castor Canadensis	North American Beaver	Mammalia	XP_020037316	81.6
Otolemur garnettii	Garnett's Greater Galago	Mammalia	XP_003800633	81.6
Camelus bactrianus	Bactrian camel	Mammalia	XP_010967491.1	78.3
Ailuropoda melanoleuca	Giant Panda	Mammalia	XP_019656626	77.7
Canis lupus familiaris	Dog	Mammalia	XP_003432924	77.2
Vicugna pacos	Alpaca	Mammalia	XP_006196356	77.2
Condylura cristata	Star-nosed mole	Mammalia	XP_012575760	76.8
Felis catus	Cat	Mammalia	XP_003982269	75.1
Pteropus vampyrus	Large flying fox	Mammalia	XP_011373720	73.3
Pantholops hodgsonii	Tibetan antelope	Mammalia	XP_005969318	72.6
Ictidomys tridecemlineatus	Thirteen lines ground squirrel	Mammalia	XP_005326967	71
Sorex araneus	Common Shrew	Mammalia	XP_012789682	69.5
Monodelphis domestica	Gray short-tailed opossum	Mammalia	XP_001367907	65.4
Echinops telfairi	Lesser Hedgehog Tenrec	Mammalia	XP_004715283	63.7
Orcinus orca	Killer whale	Mammalia	XP_004283985	61.2
Dasypus novemcinctus	Nine banded armadillo	Mammalia	XP_004451950	58.2
Dipodomys ordii	Ord's Kangaroo Rat	Mammalia	XP_012883511	56.3
Myotis lucifugus	Little Brown Myotis	Mammalia	XP_006107033	39.3
Pelodiscus sinensis	Chinese softshell turtle	Reptillia	XP_014426235	38.5
Chelonia mydas	Green Sea Turtle	Reptillia	XP_007061837	37.1
Latimeria chalumnae	West Indian Ocean coelacanth (fish)	Sarcopterygii	XP_005992740	35.3
Anolis carolinensis	Green anole (lizard)	Reptillia	XP_008103227	33.1
Gekko japonicus	Japanese Gecko	Reptillia	XP_015262861	30.1

=== Phylogeny ===
The most distant ortholog of C3orf62 are species of fish and amphibians. Orthologs of C3orf62 are not seen in birds, invertebrates, or bacteria.
