= Stenopaeic slit =

Device used in optometry

The stenopaeic slit is a black disk with a thin slit through it used by optometrists in detecting the level of an astigmatism.

The disk is rotated so that the slit is oriented at different angles, changing the retinal blur size. The stenopaeic slit is more useful to screen for a high degree of astigmatism in patients who have poor vision.
