= Toric lens =

Type of lens

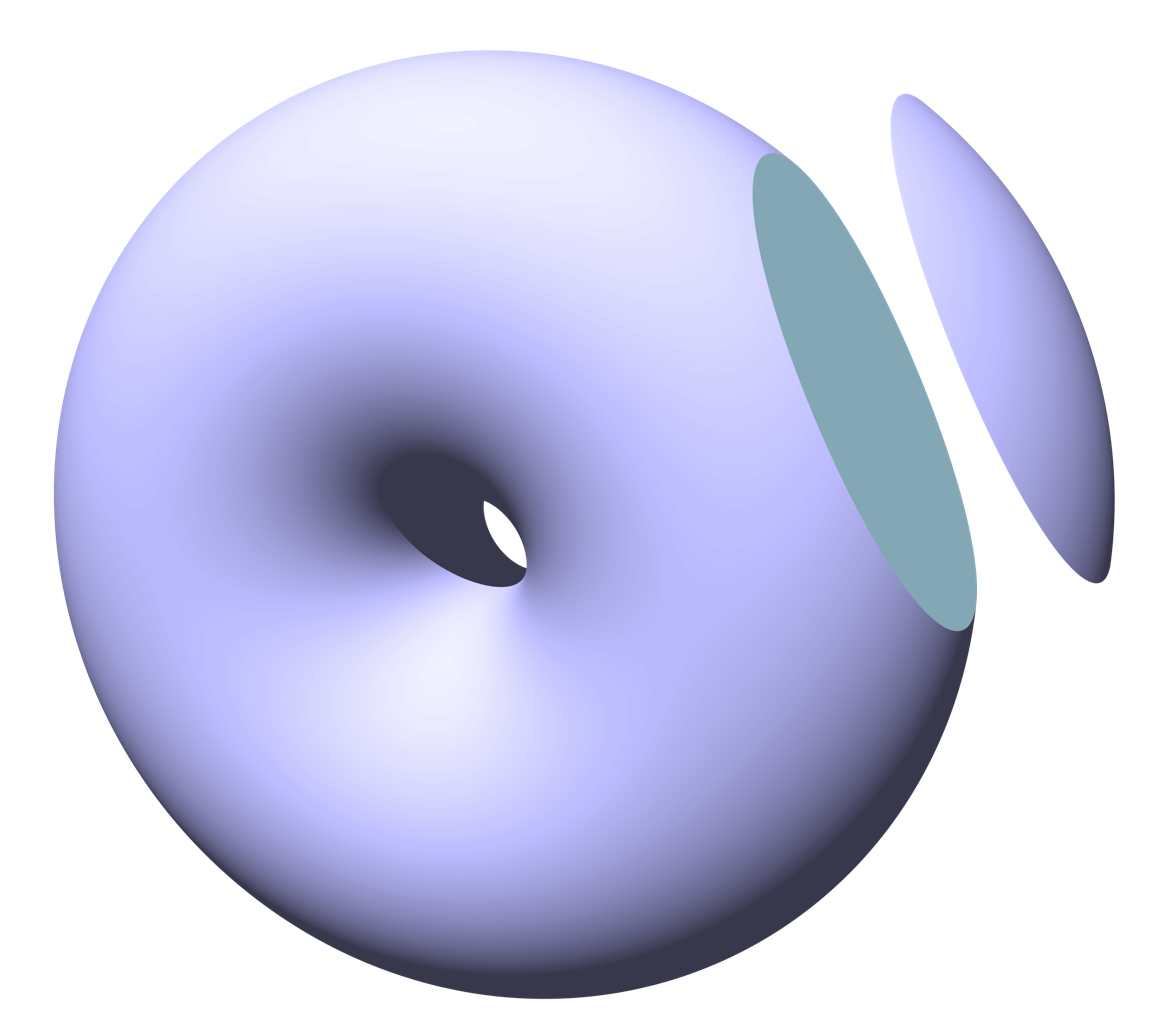
Toric lens surface as "cap" (top-right) from a torus (here with R = 1.2 r).

A toric lens is a lens with different optical power and focal length in two orientations perpendicular to each other. One of the lens surfaces is shaped like a "cap" from a torus (see figure at right), and the other one is usually spherical. Such a lens behaves like a combination of a spherical lens and a cylindrical lens. Toric lenses are used primarily in eyeglasses, contact lenses and intraocular lenses to correct astigmatism.

== Torus ==
A torus results when a circle with radius r rotates around an axis lying in the same plane as the circle (here the z axis) at a distance R from the centre of the circle.

A torus is the surface of revolution resulting when a circle with radius r rotates around an axis lying within the same plane as the circle, at a distance R from the circle's centre (see figure at right). If R > r, a ring torus is produced. If R = r, a horn torus is produced, where the opening is contracted into a single point. R < r results in a spindle torus, where only two "dips" remain from the opening; these dips become less deep as R approaches 0. When R = 0, the torus degenerates into a sphere with radius r.

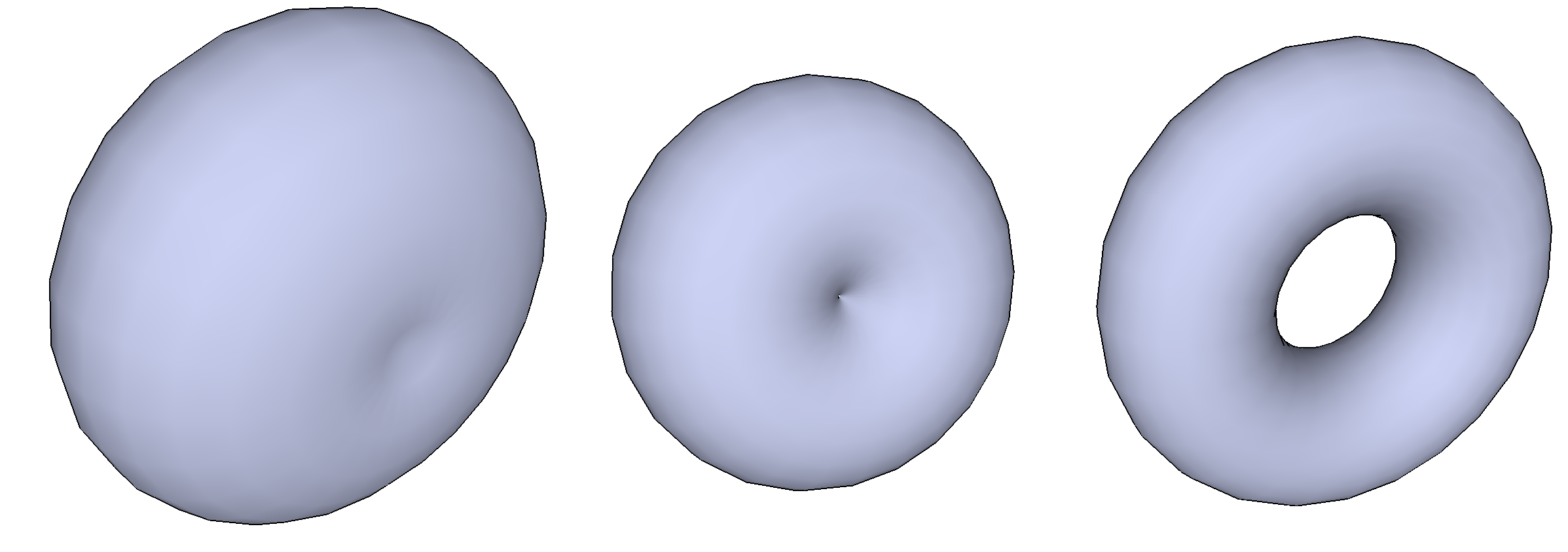
When the major radius R approaches 0 (here from right to left), the torus becomes a sphere.

== Radius of curvature and optical power ==
The greatest radius of curvature of the toric lens surface, R + r, corresponds to the smallest refractive power, S, given by

$$S = \frac{n-1}{R+r}$$,

where n is the index of refraction of the lens material.

The smallest radius of curvature, r, corresponds to the greatest refractive power, s, given by

$$s = \frac{n-1}{r}$$.

Since R + r > r, S < s. The lens behaves approximately like a combination of a spherical lens with optical power s and a cylindrical lens with power s − S. In ophthalmology and optometry, s − S is called the cylinder power of the lens (Note: This is used for correcting astigmatism. In this context, the term cylinder is based on a mathematical approximation, which is only valid for small corrective powers).

Note that both the greatest and the smallest curvature have a circular shape. Consequently, in contrast with a popular assumption, the toric lens is not an ellipsoid of revolution.

=== Light ray and its refractive power ===
Light rays within the (x,y)-plane of the torus (as defined in the figure above) are refracted according to the greatest radius of curvature, R + r, which means that it has the smallest refractive power, S.

Light rays within a plane through the axis of revolution (the z axis) of the torus are refracted according to the smallest radius of curvature, r, which means that it has the greatest refractive power, s.

As a consequence, there are two different refractive powers at orientations perpendicular to each other. At intermediate orientations, the refractive power changes gradually from the greatest to the smallest value, or reverse. This will compensate for the astigmatic aberration of the eye.

== Atoric lens ==
With modern computer-controlled design, grinding and polishing techniques, good vision corrections can be achieved for even wider angles of view by allowing certain deviations from the toric shape. This is called an atoric lens (literally, non-toric lens). They are related to toric lenses in the same way that aspheric lenses are related to spherical lenses.
