= UFD1L =

Protein-coding gene in the species Homo sapiens

UFD1

Identifiers
- Aliases: UFD1, UFD1L, ubiquitin fusion degradation 1 like (yeast), ubiquitin recognition factor in ER associated degradation 1
- External IDs: OMIM: 601754; MGI: 109353; GeneCards: UFD1
Available structures
PDB	Ortholog search: PDBe RCSB
PDB	List of PDB id codes 2YUJ, 5C1B

Gene location (Human)
Chr.	Chromosome 22 (human)
Band	22q11.21	Start	19,449,911 bp
Band	22q11.21	End	19,479,202 bp

Gene location (Mouse)
Chr.	Chromosome 16 (mouse)
Band	16 A3|16 11.65 cM	Start	18,630,529 bp
Band	16 A3|16 11.65 cM	End	18,654,011 bp
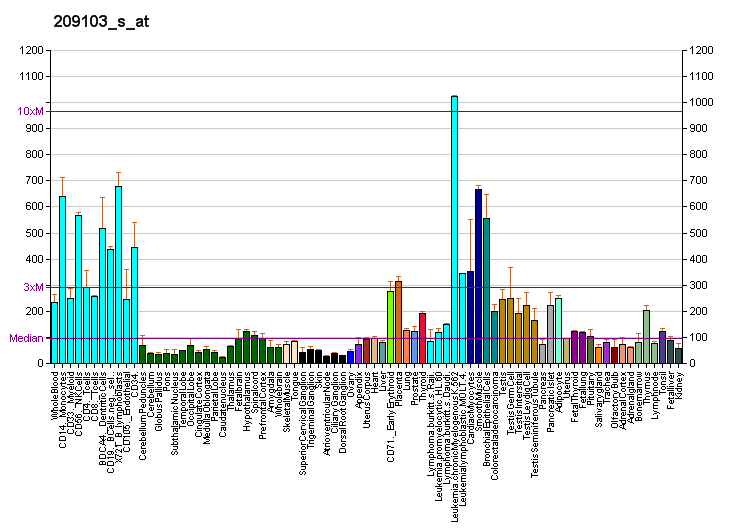
RNA expression pattern
Bgee	Human / Mouse (ortholog); Top expressed in: tendon of biceps brachii; islet of Langerhans; corpus epididymis; gastrocnemius muscle; stromal cell of endometrium; palpebral conjunctiva; skin of thigh; oral cavity; placenta; glutes / Top expressed in: dorsomedial hypothalamic nucleus; median eminence; seminiferous tubule; habenula; ventral tegmental area; dentate gyrus of hippocampal formation granule cell; superior cervical ganglion; neural layer of retina; cerebellar cortex; subiculum; More reference expression data
BioGPS	More reference expression data
Gene ontology
Molecular function	protein-containing complex binding; ATPase binding; K48-linked polyubiquitin modification-dependent protein binding; signaling receptor binding; protein binding; thiol-dependent deubiquitinase
Cellular component	cytoplasm; cytosol; nucleus; UFD1-NPL4 complex; nucleoplasm; endoplasmic reticulum; VCP-NPL4-UFD1 AAA ATPase complex
Biological process	error-free translesion synthesis; skeletal system development; retrograde protein transport, ER to cytosol; ER-associated misfolded protein catabolic process; proteasome-mediated ubiquitin-dependent protein catabolic process; ubiquitin-dependent protein catabolic process; protein deubiquitination; negative regulation of type I interferon production; negative regulation of RIG-I signaling pathway
Sources:Amigo / QuickGO
Orthologs
Databases	NCBI: entry; OMA: entry
Species	Human	Mouse
Entrez	7353	22230
Ensembl	ENSG00000070010	ENSMUSG00000005262
UniProt	Q92890	P70362
RefSeq (mRNA)	NM_001035247; NM_005659; NM_001362910	NM_011672
RefSeq (protein)	NP_001030324; NP_005650; NP_001349839	NP_035802
Location (UCSC)	Chr 22: 19.45 – 19.48 Mb	Chr 16: 18.63 – 18.65 Mb
PubMed search
- Wikidata
View/Edit Human	View/Edit Mouse

Ubiquitin fusion degradation protein 1 homolog is a protein that in humans is encoded by the UFD1 gene (previously UFD1L).

== Function ==
The protein encoded by this gene forms a complex with two other proteins, NPL4 and VCP, that is necessary for the degradation of ubiquitinated proteins. In addition, this complex controls the disassembly of the mitotic spindle and the formation of a closed nuclear envelope after mitosis. Mutations in this gene have been associated with Catch 22 syndrome as well as cardiac and craniofacial defects. Alternative splicing results in multiple transcript variants encoding different isoforms.

== Interactions ==
UFD1L has been shown to interact with NPLOC4.
