= Noel Alpins =

Australian ophthalmologist

Noel Alpins AM is an Australian ophthalmologist who developed the Alpins method of astigmatism analysis used in refractive, corneal, and cataract surgery, used in the research of LASIK (laser-assisted in situ keratomileusis).

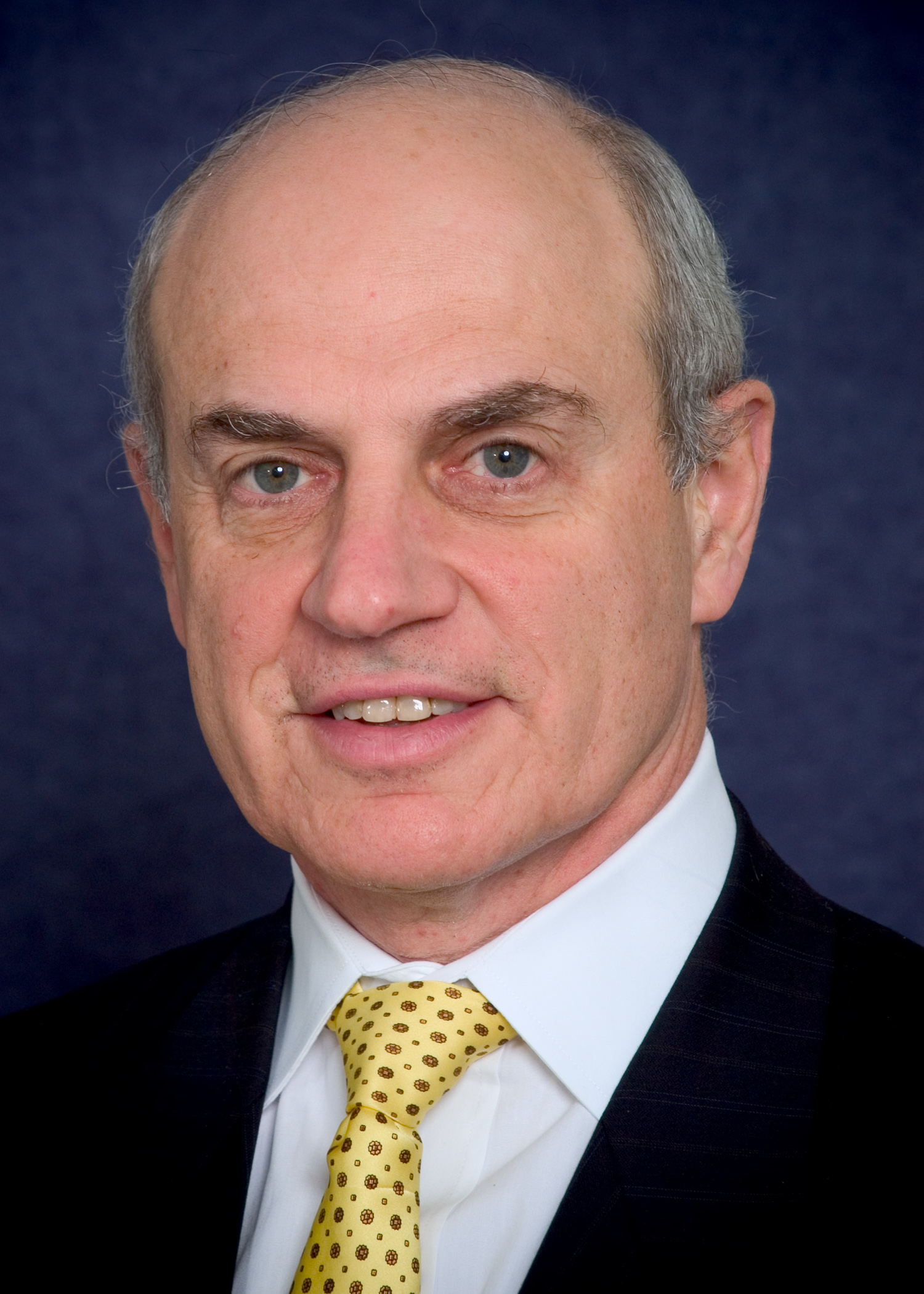

== Career ==
Alpins has specialized in cataract and refractive surgery since founding NewVision Clinics in Melbourne, Australia, in 1996. He received the 2012 International Society of Refractive Surgery (ISRS) and American Academy of Ophthalmology (AAO) Lans Distinguished Award in Chicago, and in 2014 he received with the ISRS Lifetime Achievement Award. Alpins is on the international advisory board for Refractive Surgery in China and is also an international council member of the ISRS of the AAO.

In January 2017 Alpins was awarded Member in the General Division of the Order of Australia for "significant service to ophthalmology, particularly to the development of innovative refractive surgery techniques, and to professional associations".

In October 2017, Alpins gave the Sir Norman Gregg Lecture at the 49th Annual Scientific Congress of The Royal Australian and New Zealand College of Ophthalmologists.

In November 2017, Alpins was appointed Honorary Clinical Professor to Melbourne University’s Department of Ophthalmology.

In 2018, Alpins published Practical Astigmatism Planning and Analysis, a book detailing the components of the Alpins Method procedure.

In 2019, Alpins was awarded the José I. Barraquer Lecture and Award which honors a physician who has made significant contributions in the field of refractive surgery during his or her career.

== Alpins Method ==
The Alpins Method employs the vector analytic approach to astigmatism analysis, involving an ophthalmic surgical analysis system, called ASSORT (Alpins Statistical System for Ophthalmic Refractive Surgery Techniques), designed to help plan and analyze the results of refractive, corneal, and cataract surgical procedures. The method can also be used to refine surgical techniques or correct laser settings in future procedures. The system underpins astigmatism analysis approaches developed by the American National Standards Institute (ANSI) Astigmatism Project Group.
