= Jackson cross cylinder =

Ophthalmic instrument

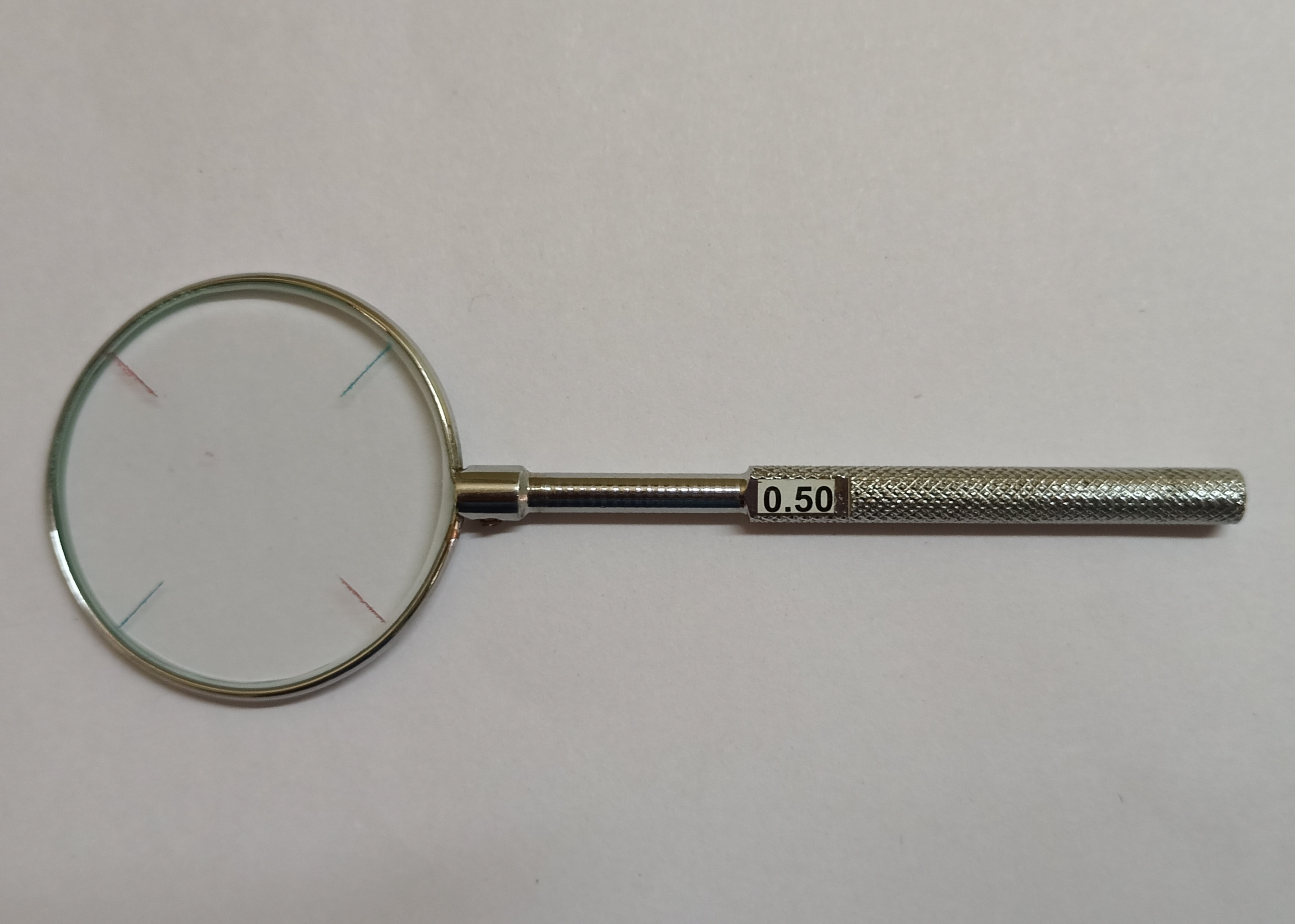
- Jackson cross cylinder of power +/- 0.50 diopter
- Test of: Astigmatism
- Based on: circle of confusion

The Jackson cross cylinder (JCC) is an instrument used by ophthalmologists, orthoptists and optometrists in their routine eye examination, particularly in determination of corrective lens power in patients with astigmatism. It is also used for testing near point of the eye.

== Instrument ==
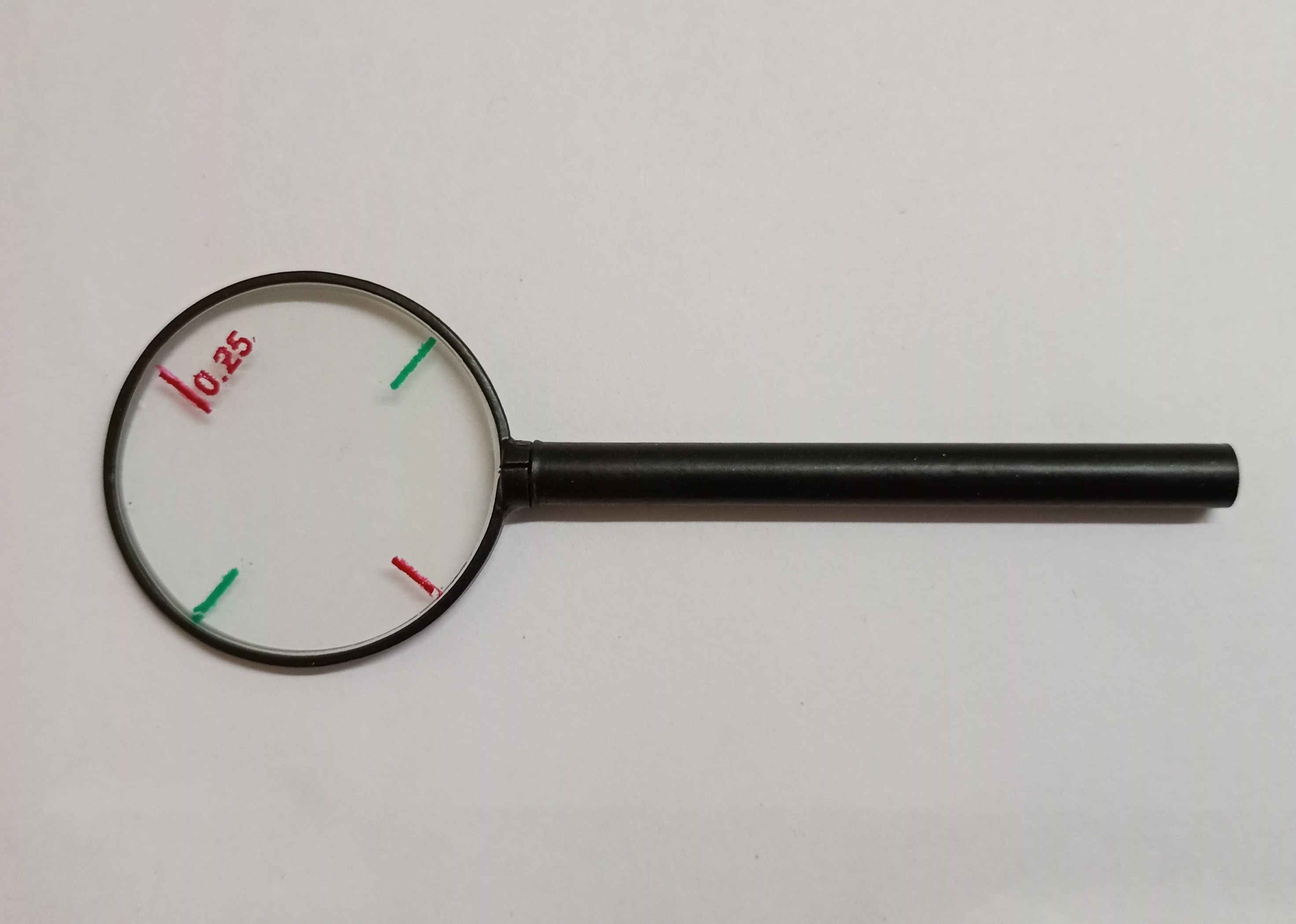
Jackson cross cylinder of +/- 0.25 diopter

The Jackson cross cylinder is a single low-power lens, which is a combination of a plus cylinder and a minus cylinder of equal power with axes perpendicular to each other, with a handle placed between the two axes at 45 degrees. Therefore JCC is a spherocylindrical lens in which the power of the cylinder is double the power of the sphere and of opposite sign e.g. +0.5DS/-1.0DC or +0.25DS/-0.5DC. JCC are available in different powers, including ± 1.00, most commonly used are ± 0.25 and ± 0.50. There are dots or lines to indicate the axis of minus and plus powers.

== Indications ==
The Jackson cross cylinder is used to determine corrective lens power and axis in patients with astigmatism. It is also used for testing the near point of the eye.

== Procedure ==
Best corrected vision with a spherical lens should be identified before using a Jackson cross cylinder. In case of astigmatism the best vision with a spherical lens is obtained when the circle of confusion is on the retina.

=== Detecting astigmatism ===
Best corrected vision with a spherical lens should be identified first. The JCC lens is then placed over spherical lens, first with the minus-cylinder axis at 180°, and then with the axis at 90°. If there is no difference in vision, repeat the test with JCC lens axis 45° and 135°. If the patient again reports no difference in vision, there is no astigmatism. If there is improvement in either positions, cylindrical lens should be tried to correct astigmatism.

=== Refinement of axis ===
Refinement of axis of cylindrical lens in astigmatism correction is done by placing JCC along with corrective lens with the handle parallel to the axis of corrective lens in the trial frame. Handle is rotated so that the minus and plus lens in cross cylinder interchanges. If there is no difference in vision in either position, the axis of corrective lens is correct and if there is difference in vision, axis should be rotated to get a clear vision. Axis should be rotated by 5 degree on better side.

=== Refinement of power ===
Refinement of power of cylindrical lens in astigmatism correction is done by placing JCC along with corrective lens with the axis of JCC power parallel to the axis of corrective lens in the trial frame. Handle is rotated so that the minus and plus lens in cross cylinder interchange. If there is no difference in vision in either position, the power of corrective lens is correct and if there is difference in vision, power should be adjusted.

=== Near point of accommodation ===
The uniocular and binocular cross cylinder findings at 40 cm give information about near point of accommodation and near addition needed to correct presbyopia.

== History ==
In 1837, English mathematician and astronomer George Biddell Airy invented the cylindrical lens and used it to correct astigmatism. In 1849, Irish English physicist and mathematician George Stokes invented the Stokes lens to diagnose astigmatism. This lens consisted of two cylindrical lenses, one plano-convex and one plano-concave, which can be rotated in opposite directions. In 1887 Edward Jackson described the use of modified Stokes' lens in detecting astigmatism, and in 1907 he described the determination of the axis of a correcting cylinder in astigmatism using a cross cylinder. The modified cross cylinder lens with a handle which he used was later known as Jackson cross cylinder.
