= Alpins method =

System to plan and analyse results of refractive surgical procedures

The Alpins Method is a system to plan and analyze the results of refractive surgical procedures, such as laser in-situ keratomileus (LASIK). The Alpins Method is also used to plan cataract/toric intraocular lens (IOL) surgical procedures.

The Alpins Method uses vector mathematics to determine a goal for astigmatism correction and analyze factors involved if treatment fails to reach that goal. The method can also be used to refine surgical techniques or correct laser settings in future procedures.

== Background ==
In the early 1990s, astigmatism analysis and treatment applied to laser modalities was inconsistent and did not assess the success of the results or the extent to which surgical goals had been achieved. The advent of excimer laser technology (e.g., laser-assisted in situ keratomileusis, or LASIK) also introduced a conundrum between incisional and ablation techniques; specifically, should treatment be planned according to refractive cylinder values as introduced with laser refractive surgery, or corneal astigmatism parameters as had been customary with incisional surgery.

Developed by Australian ophthalmologist Noel Alpins and introduced in 1993, the Alpins Method provides a coherent basis for reporting astigmatism results, and on this basis became the standard in the major ophthalmology journals, and was accepted worldwide for studies that include refraction and corneal astigmatism measurements. The method provides a consistent, logical approach to quantifying and comparing the success of various refractive surgical procedures, and refining/planning surgery to achieve even better results, both in individuals and groups of individuals receiving refractive surgery.

The Alpins Method has been used in some research studies of LASIK. In 2006 the American National Standards Institute (ANSI) published guidelines based on the Alpins Method, designed to help manufacturers demonstrate the efficacy of refractive surgical lasers.

== Basics ==
The Alpins Method determines a treatment path and defined an astigmatic target that in many instances is not zero, although prior to the Alpins Method zero had been a nearly unanimous, but unachievable, preference.

=== Golf analogy ===
The Alpins Method of astigmatism analysis has many parallels to the game of golf. A golf putt is a vector, possessing magnitude (length) and axis (direction). The intended putt (the path from the ball to the hole) corresponds to Alpins' target-induced astigmatism vector (TIA), which is the astigmatic change (by magnitude and axis) the surgeon intends to induce to correct the patient's pre-existing astigmatism to the derived or calculated target. The actual putt (the path the ball follows when hit) corresponds to Alpins' surgical-induced astigmatism vector (SIA), which is the amount and axis of astigmatic change the surgeon induces. If the golfer misses the cup, the difference vector (DV) corresponds to the second putt—that is, a putt (by magnitude and axis) that would allow the golfer to hit the cup (the surgeon to completely correct it) on a second attempt.

=== Indices generated ===
The diagram superimposed on the golf putt image corresponds to a double-angle vector diagram (DAVD), which allows calculations using rectangular (Cartesian) coordinates. Vectors can only be calculated; they cannot be measured like astigmatism. Line 1 in the diagram represents a patient's preoperative astigmatism by magnitude (length of the line) and axis (which in a DAVD is twice the patient's measured axis of preoperative astigmatism). Line 2 represents the target astigmatism—that is, the magnitude and axis of the correction the surgeon would like to achieve. Line 3 represents the achieved astigmatism—that is, the magnitude and axis of postoperative astigmatism.

The TIA, SIA, and DV and their various relationships generate the following indices, which comprise the essence of the Alpins Method:

- Correction index (CI)—The ratio of the SIA to the TIA—what the surgery-induced versus what the surgery was meant to induce. The CI is preferably 1; it is greater than 1 if an overcorrection occurs and less than 1 if there is an under-correction. The CI is calculated by dividing the SIA (actual effect) by the TIA (target effect).
- Coefficient of adjustment (CA)—The inverse of the CI, the CA quantifies the modification needed to the initial surgery plan to have achieved a CI of 1, the ideal correction. If the surgeon achieves an overcorrection, for example, the CA might be 0.9, indicating that the surgeon should have selected a correction of 90% of what was selected. The CA can be used to refine nomograms for future procedures.
- The magnitude of error (MofE)—The intended correction minus the actual correction in diopters.
- Angle of error (AE)—The angle described by the vectors of the intended correction versus the achieved correction (SIA minus TIA). By convention, the AE is positive if the achieved correction is on an axis counterclockwise to where it was intended, and negative if the achieved correction is clockwise to its intended axis.
- Index of success (IOS)—The IOS is calculated by dividing the DV (how far the target is missed) by the TIA (the original target effect). The IOS is a relative measure of success; that is, if golfer John attempts a long putt and golfer Bob a shorter one, and each ends up the same distance from the cup, John's putt can be considered more successful because he had the longer initial putt and a lower IOS (zero being perfect). The IOS is a valuable measure of the relative effectiveness of various surgical procedures.

=== Vector planning ===
Clinical studies support vector planning both in healthy astigmatic eyes and in eyes with keratoconus. Additionally, Alpins and Stamatelatos showed that combining refraction (using wavefront measurements) with Vector Planning provided better visual outcomes than using wavefront planning alone.

In astigmatism treatments using Vector Planning, with the advance of tomography devices, various corneal astigmatism parameters can now be measured for different parts of the cornea (predominantly, one corneal parameter and one refractive parameter is used). By dividing the cornea into 2 halves, a total corneal astigmatism parameter can be measured for each half of the cornea with varying emphases on corneal and refractive parameters, maximally reducing the astigmatism for each half.
