= Phosducin-like =

Protein-coding gene in humans

PDCL

Identifiers
- Aliases: PDCL, PhLP, Phosducin-like, phosducin like
- External IDs: OMIM: 604421; MGI: 1914716; HomoloGene: 38043; GeneCards: PDCL; OMA:PDCL - orthologs

Gene location (Human)
Chr.	Chromosome 9 (human)
Band	9q33.2	Start	122,798,389 bp
Band	9q33.2	End	122,828,588 bp

Gene location (Mouse)
Chr.	Chromosome 2 (mouse)
Band	2|2 B	Start	37,240,086 bp
Band	2|2 B	End	37,249,344 bp
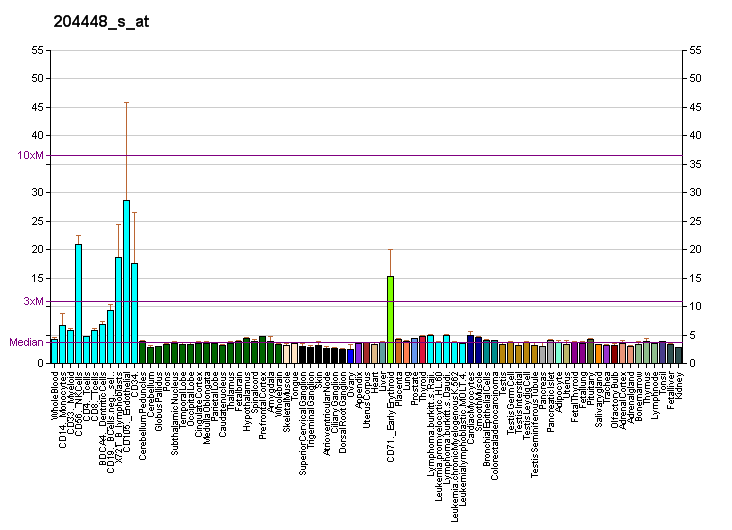

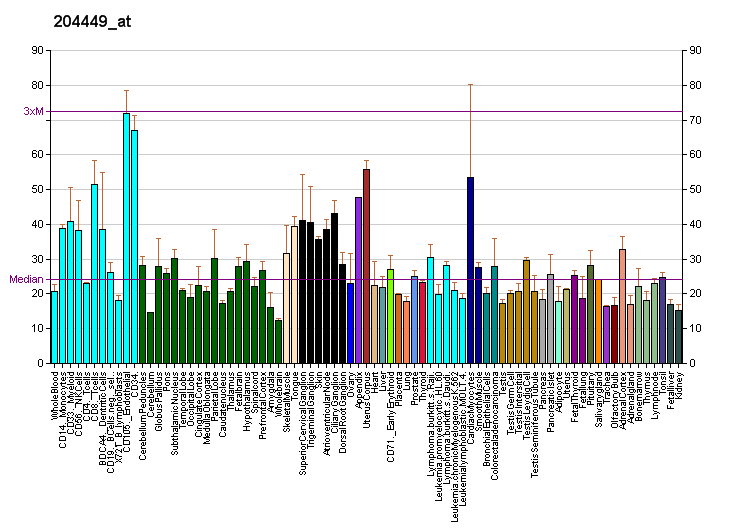
RNA expression pattern
Bgee	Human / Mouse (ortholog); Top expressed in: buccal mucosa cell; endothelial cell; visceral pleura; oocyte; parietal pleura; tibia; Achilles tendon; secondary oocyte; germinal epithelium; epithelium of nasopharynx / Top expressed in: pineal gland; cumulus cell; neural layer of retina; medial ganglionic eminence; stria vascularis; carotid body; superior cervical ganglion; vestibular sensory epithelium; mandibular prominence; maxillary prominence; More reference expression data
BioGPS	More reference expression data
Gene ontology
Molecular function	protein binding; queuine tRNA-ribosyltransferase activity; protein-containing complex binding
Cellular component	cytoplasm; cytosol; cilium; cell projection
Biological process	queuosine biosynthetic process; heterotrimeric G-protein complex assembly; regulation of G protein-coupled receptor signaling pathway; negative regulation of protein refolding; signal transduction; visual perception; response to stimulus; protein folding; positive regulation of smoothened signaling pathway; cell projection organization
Sources:Amigo / QuickGO
Orthologs
Species	Human	Mouse
Entrez	5082	67466
Ensembl	ENSG00000136940	ENSMUSG00000009030
UniProt	Q13371	Q9DBX2
RefSeq (mRNA)	NM_005388	NM_026176
RefSeq (protein)	NP_005379	NP_080452
Location (UCSC)	Chr 9: 122.8 – 122.83 Mb	Chr 2: 37.24 – 37.25 Mb
PubMed search
- Wikidata
View/Edit Human	View/Edit Mouse

Phosducin-like protein is a protein that in humans is encoded by the PDCL gene.

Phosducin-like protein is a putative modulator of heterotrimeric G proteins. The protein shares extensive amino acid sequence homology with phosducin, a phosphoprotein expressed in the retina and pineal gland. Both phosducin-like protein and phosphoducin have been shown to regulate G-protein signaling by binding to the beta-gamma subunits of G proteins.
