= Javal's rule =

Javal's rule is a mathematical formula used to estimate astigmatism based on keratometry readings. The estimate is useful for high cylinder measures, generally over -2.00 diopters. The estimate is found by multiplying the difference in power between the two meridians by 1.25 and factoring in the average lenticular astigmatism, which is -0.50 x 090.
