= Phosducin =

Protein found in humans

PDC
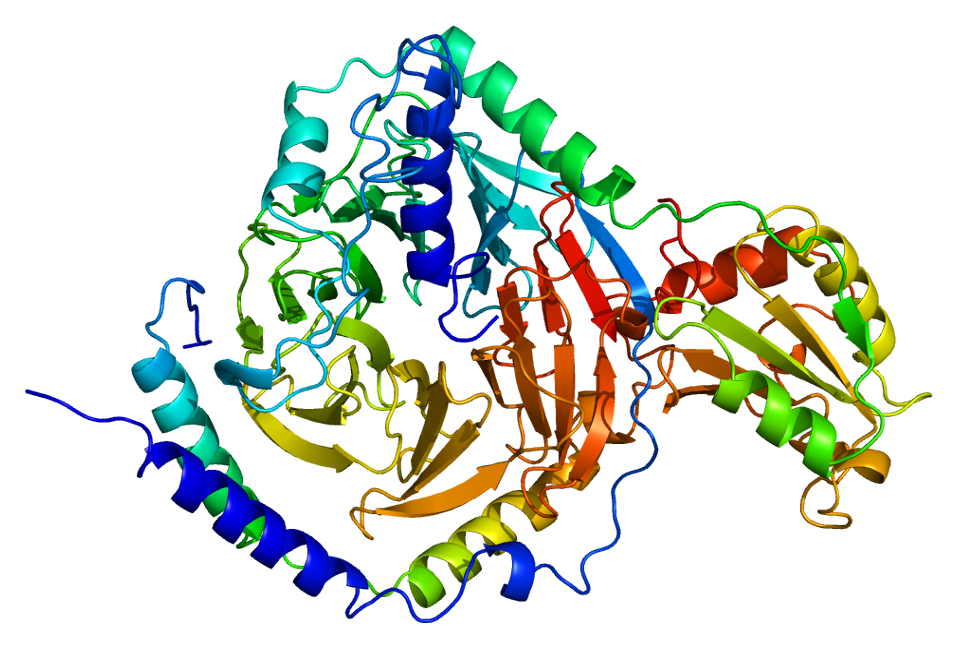

Identifiers
- Aliases: PDC, MEKA, PHD, PhLOP, PhLP, phosducin
- External IDs: OMIM: 171490; MGI: 98090; GeneCards: PDC

Gene location (Human)
Chr.	Chromosome 1 (human)
Band	1q31.1	Start	186,443,566 bp
Band	1q31.1	End	186,461,114 bp

Gene location (Mouse)
Chr.	Chromosome 1 (mouse)
Band	1 G1|1 63.84 cM	Start	150,195,168 bp
Band	1 G1|1 63.84 cM	End	150,209,657 bp
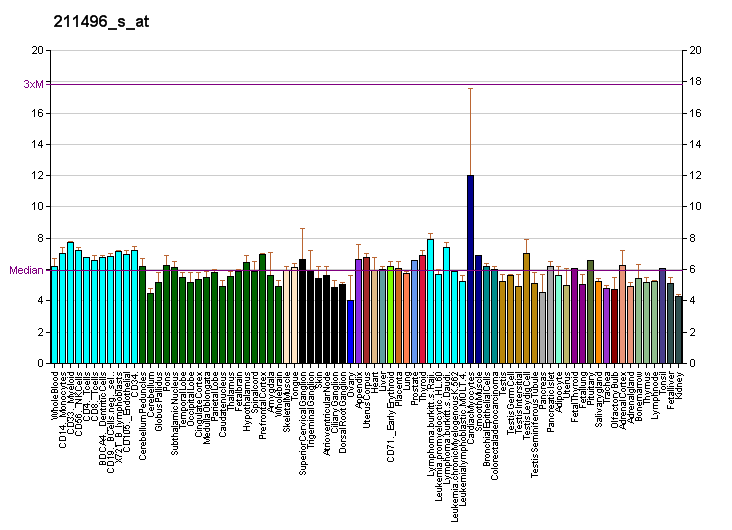
RNA expression pattern
Bgee	Human / Mouse (ortholog); Top expressed in: testicle; retinal pigment epithelium; right hemisphere of cerebellum; corpus callosum; epithelium of colon; Achilles tendon; Brodmann area 9; skin of hip; tibial nerve; striated muscle tissue / Top expressed in: neural layer of retina; retinal pigment epithelium; epithelium of lens; ciliary body; corneal stroma; iris; pineal gland; gallbladder; conjunctival fornix; internal carotid artery; More reference expression data
BioGPS	More reference expression data
Gene ontology
Molecular function	phospholipase inhibitor activity; queuine tRNA-ribosyltransferase activity
Cellular component	photoreceptor inner segment; cytoplasm; cytosol; photoreceptor outer segment; cell projection; cilium; nucleus
Biological process	queuosine biosynthetic process; G protein-coupled receptor signaling pathway; response to stimulus; visual perception; phototransduction; negative regulation of catalytic activity
Sources:Amigo / QuickGO
Orthologs
Databases	NCBI: entry; OMA: entry
Species	Human	Mouse
Entrez	5132	20028
Ensembl	ENSG00000116703	ENSMUSG00000006007
UniProt	P20941; Q52LP8	Q9QW08
RefSeq (mRNA)	NM_002597; NM_022576; NM_022577	NM_001159730; NM_024458
RefSeq (protein)	NP_002588; NP_072098; NP_002588.3	NP_001153202; NP_077778
Location (UCSC)	Chr 1: 186.44 – 186.46 Mb	Chr 1: 150.2 – 150.21 Mb
PubMed search
- Wikidata
View/Edit Human	View/Edit Mouse

Phosducin, also known as PDC, is a human protein and gene. It belongs to the phosducin family of proteins.

This gene encodes a phosphoprotein, which is located in the outer and inner segments of the rod cells in the retina. This protein may participate in the regulation of visual phototransduction or in the integration of photoreceptor metabolism. It modulates the phototransduction cascade by interacting with the beta and gamma subunits of the retinal G-protein transducin. By associating with these subunits only, the transducin alpha subunit will remain active for longer. This will increase the amount of time of visual excitation.

This gene is a potential candidate gene for retinitis pigmentosa and Usher syndrome type II. Alternatively spliced transcript variants encoding different isoforms have been identified.

== See also ==
- Phosducin family
