= Cylindrical lens =

Optical device

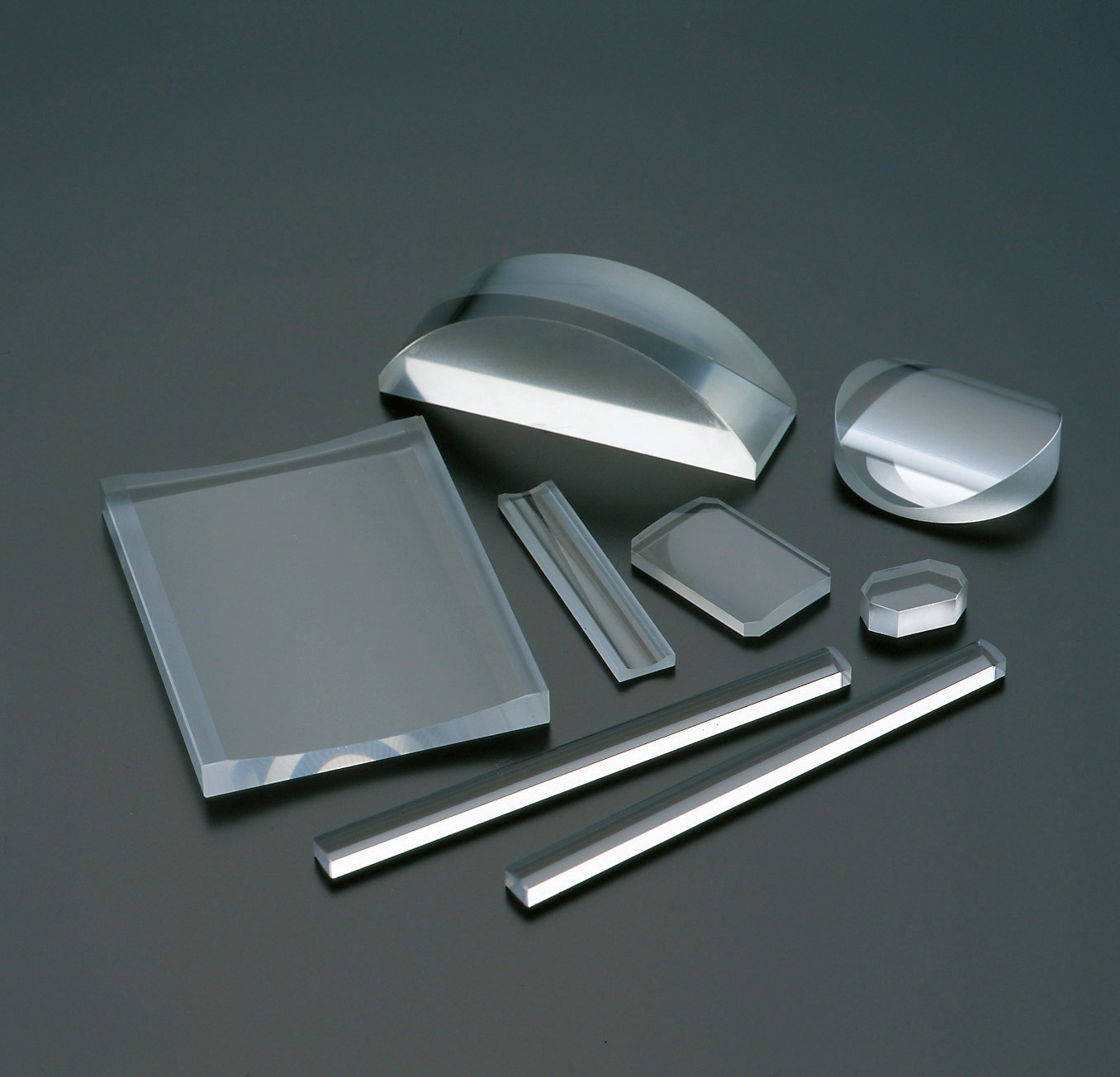
Cylindrical lenses.

A cylindrical lens is a lens which focuses light into a line instead of a point as a spherical lens would. The curved face or faces of a cylindrical lens are sections of a cylinder, and focus the image passing through it into a line parallel to intersection of the surface of the lens and a plane tangent to it along the cylinder's axis. The lens converges or diverges the image in the direction perpendicular to this line, and leaves it unaltered in the direction parallel to its cylinder's axis (in the tangent plane).

A toric lens combines the effect of a cylindrical lens with that of an ordinary spherical lens.

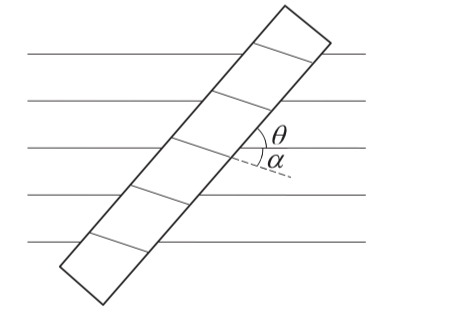
The Cylindrical rod can magnify only those linear dimensions which are perpendicular to its axis, and cannot magnify linear dimensions which are parallel to its axis.

If a thin cylindrical rod is placed on a ruled white paper with the axis of the rod making an angle θ with the ruled lines, the lines will appear broken and tilted at some angle α as shown in the figure, the Refractive Index of the rod can be given as:

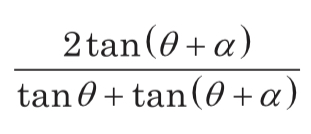

== Uses ==
=== Uses in optometry ===
- Cylindrical lenses are prescribed to correct astigmatism.
- Cross cylinder, which is a combination of two cylindrical lenses with equal strength and opposite power, is used in subjective refraction to diagnose astigmatism, and assess the strength and axis of the astigmatic power etc.
- Maddox rods, made up of cylindrical lenses arranged in parallel, are used to detect strabismus and diplopia.

=== Other uses ===
- In a light sheet microscope, a cylindrical lens is placed in front of the illumination objective to create the light sheet used for imaging.
- Cylindrical lenses are used in optical spectrometers.
- Cylindrical lenses are used in holography.
- Doublet cylinder lens system is used in optical coherence tomography.
- Cylinder lenses are also used in many laser applications. A cylindrical lens can be used to create a laser line. A doublet cylinder lens is used to make laser sheets and circularize elliptical beams from laser diodes.
- Cylindrical lenses are key to make anamorphic lenses, useful in photography and cinematography to create a widescreen image without needing to crop the frame by horizontally squeezing the image. (see Cinemascope and Techniscope)

== See also ==
- Lenticular lens
- Jackson cross cylinder

== Other Sources ==
- Jacobs, Donald H. Fundamentals of Optical Engineering. MC Graw-Hill Book Co., 1943.
