= TNFAIP8L2 =

Protein-coding gene in humans

Identifiers
- Aliases: TNFAIP8L2, TIPE2, TNF alpha induced protein 8 like 2
- External IDs: OMIM: 612112; MGI: 1917019; GeneCards: TNFAIP8L2
Available structures
PDB	Ortholog search: PDBe RCSB
PDB	List of PDB id codes 3F4M

Gene location (Human)
Chr.	Chromosome 1 (human)
Band	1q21.3	Start	151,156,649 bp
Band	1q21.3	End	151,159,749 bp

Gene location (Mouse)
Chr.	Chromosome 3 (mouse)
Band	3|3 F2.1	Start	95,046,832 bp
Band	3|3 F2.1	End	95,049,671 bp
RNA expression pattern
Bgee	Human / Mouse (ortholog); Top expressed in: granulocyte; monocyte; blood; mucosa of ileum; spleen; appendix; lymph node; gonad; testicle; trabecular bone / Top expressed in: granulocyte; mesenteric lymph nodes; blood; stroma of bone marrow; blastocyst; spleen; subcutaneous adipose tissue; thymus; jejunum; morula; More reference expression data
BioGPS	n/a
Gene ontology
Molecular function	protein binding
Cellular component	cytoplasm
Biological process	innate immune response; negative regulation of T cell activation; negative regulation of inflammatory response; immune system process; regulation of apoptotic process
Sources:Amigo / QuickGO
Orthologs
Databases	NCBI: entry; OMA: entry
Species	Human	Mouse
Entrez	79626	69769
Ensembl	ENSG00000163154	ENSMUSG00000013707
UniProt	Q6P589	Q9D8Y7
RefSeq (mRNA)	NM_024575	NM_027206
RefSeq (protein)	NP_078851	NP_081482
Location (UCSC)	Chr 1: 151.16 – 151.16 Mb	Chr 3: 95.05 – 95.05 Mb
PubMed search
- Wikidata
View/Edit Human	View/Edit Mouse

TNF alpha induced protein 8 like 2 (TNFAIP8L2), also known as TIPE2, is a protein that in humans is encoded by the TNFAIP8L2 gene. It is preferentially expressed in human myeloid cell types and serves as an immune checkpoint regulator of inflammation and metabolism.

== Function ==
TNFAIP8L2 is a member of the TNFAIP8 (tumor necrosis factor-α-induced protein 8, or TIPE) family that function as transfer proteins for the second messenger lipids PIP_{2} and PIP_{3}. The other three family members are TNFAIP8, TNFAIP8L1 and TNFAIP8L3.

== Structure ==
The crystal structure of TIPE2 reveals that it contains a large, hydrophobic central cavity that is poised for cofactor binding.

== Clinical significance ==
TIPE2 acts as a negative regulator of the immune system. It is down-regulated in patients with infectious and autoimmune diseases and also acts as a tumor suppressor in several types of cancer. Its knockout leads to leukocytosis and systemic inflammatory disorders in mice.
