= NPLOC4 =

Protein-coding gene in humans

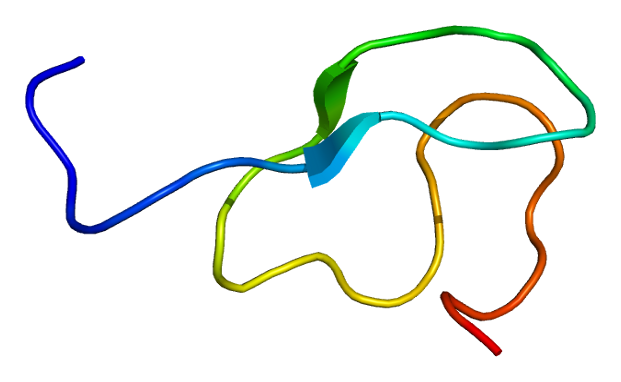

Identifiers
- Aliases: NPLOC4, NPL4, NPL4 homolog, ubiquitin recognition factor
- External IDs: OMIM: 606590; MGI: 2679787; GeneCards: NPLOC4
Available structures
PDB	Ortholog search: PDBe RCSB
PDB	List of PDB id codes 2PJH

Gene location (Human)
Chr.	Chromosome 17 (human)
Band	17q25.3	Start	81,556,887 bp
Band	17q25.3	End	81,648,465 bp

Gene location (Mouse)
Chr.	Chromosome 11 (mouse)
Band	11|11 E2	Start	120,271,196 bp
Band	11|11 E2	End	120,328,534 bp
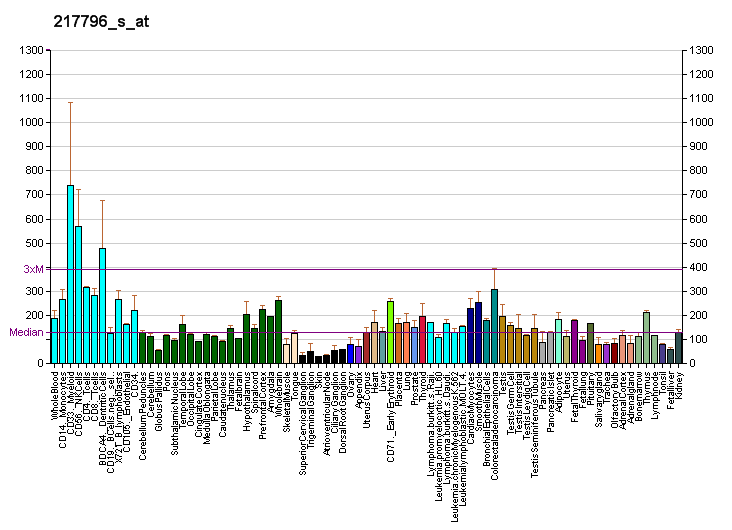
RNA expression pattern
Bgee	Human / Mouse (ortholog); Top expressed in: gastrocnemius muscle; apex of heart; muscle of thigh; stromal cell of endometrium; right testis; right coronary artery; islet of Langerhans; left testis; left ventricle; right adrenal gland / Top expressed in: spermatocyte; muscle of thigh; cumulus cell; interventricular septum; ascending aorta; aortic valve; spermatid; supraoptic nucleus; seminiferous tubule; lip; More reference expression data
BioGPS	More reference expression data
Gene ontology
Molecular function	ubiquitin binding; protein binding; metal ion binding; ubiquitin protein ligase binding
Cellular component	cytoplasm; cytosol; nuclear outer membrane-endoplasmic reticulum membrane network; endoplasmic reticulum; nucleus; UFD1-NPL4 complex; nucleoplasm; VCP-NPL4-UFD1 AAA ATPase complex
Biological process	error-free translesion synthesis; retrograde protein transport, ER to cytosol; Golgi organization; ubiquitin-dependent ERAD pathway; proteasome-mediated ubiquitin-dependent protein catabolic process; negative regulation of type I interferon production; negative regulation of RIG-I signaling pathway; ubiquitin-dependent protein catabolic process
Sources:Amigo / QuickGO
Orthologs
Databases	NCBI: entry; OMA: entry
Species	Human	Mouse
Entrez	55666	217365
Ensembl	ENSG00000182446	ENSMUSG00000039703
UniProt	Q8TAT6	P60670
RefSeq (mRNA)	NM_017921; NM_001369698	NM_001195023; NM_199469
RefSeq (protein)	NP_060391; NP_001356627; NP_060391.2	NP_001181952; NP_955763
Location (UCSC)	Chr 17: 81.56 – 81.65 Mb	Chr 11: 120.27 – 120.33 Mb
PubMed search
- Wikidata
View/Edit Human	View/Edit Mouse

Nuclear protein localization protein 4 homolog is a protein that in humans is encoded by the NPLOC4 gene.

== Interactions ==
NPLOC4 has been shown to interact with UFD1L.
