= ZC3H11A =

Protein-coding gene in humans

Identifiers
- Aliases: ZC3H11A, ZC3HDC11A, zinc finger CCCH-type containing 11A
- External IDs: OMIM: 613513; MGI: 1917829; GeneCards: ZC3H11A

Gene location (Human)
Chr.	Chromosome 1 (human)
Band	1q32.1	Start	203,795,654 bp
Band	1q32.1	End	203,854,999 bp
RNA expression pattern
Bgee	Human / Mouse (ortholog); Top expressed in: corpus callosum; endometrium; lymph node; cerebellar hemisphere; Achilles tendon; right hemisphere of cerebellum; ventricular zone; skin of abdomen; pituitary gland; skin of leg / n/a; More reference expression data
BioGPS	n/a
Gene ontology
Molecular function	protein binding; metal ion binding; RNA binding; DNA-binding transcription factor activity, RNA polymerase II-specific; mRNA binding
Cellular component	transcription export complex; nucleoplasm
Biological process	poly(A)+ mRNA export from nucleus; mRNA transport; RNA export from nucleus; termination of RNA polymerase II transcription; mRNA 3'-end processing; mRNA export from nucleus; transport; regulation of transcription by RNA polymerase II
Sources:Amigo / QuickGO
Orthologs
Databases	NCBI: entry; OMA: entry
Species	Human	Mouse
Entrez	9877	70579
Ensembl	ENSG00000058673	ENSMUSG00000102976; ENSMUSG00000116275
UniProt	O75152	Q6NZF1
RefSeq (mRNA)	NM_014827; NM_001319238; NM_001319239; NM_001350261; NM_001350262 NM_001350263; NM_001350264; NM_001350265; NM_001350266	NM_001276767; NM_144530; NM_001357228
RefSeq (protein)	NP_001306167; NP_001306168; NP_055642; NP_001337190; NP_001337191 NP_001337192; NP_001337193; NP_001337194; NP_001337195; NP_001363263; NP_001363264; NP_001363265; NP_001363266; NP_001363267; NP_001363268; NP_001363269; NP_001363270; NP_001363271; NP_001363272; NP_001363273; NP_001363274; NP_001363275; NP_001363276; NP_001363277; NP_001363278; NP_001363279; NP_001363280; NP_001363281; NP_001363282; NP_001363283; NP_001363284; NP_001363285; NP_001363286; NP_001363287; NP_001363288; NP_001363289; NP_001363290; NP_001363291; NP_001363292; NP_001363293; NP_001363294; NP_001363295; NP_001363296	NP_001263696; NP_653113; NP_001344157
Location (UCSC)	Chr 1: 203.8 – 203.85 Mb	n/a
PubMed search
- Wikidata
View/Edit Human	View/Edit Mouse

Zinc finger CCCH domain-containing protein 11A is a protein that in humans is encoded by the ZC3H11A gene. ZC3H11A is a part of the transcription export (TREX) complex and plays a role in exporting of mRNAs from nucleus to cytoplasm. It is considered as stress-induced nuclear protein and maintains mRNAs exporting when the cells are under stress. Loss of functioning of ZC3H11A gene in HeLa cells results in abortion of the replication of nuclear replicating viruses but not cytoplasmic replicating viruses. It is discovered that ZC3H11A is significant for viability and metabolic regulation of mouse embryo
