= TXNDC9 =

Protein-coding gene in the species Homo sapiens

Identifiers
- Aliases: TXNDC9, APACD, PHLP3, thioredoxin domain containing 9
- External IDs: OMIM: 612564; MGI: 2138153; GeneCards: TXNDC9

Gene location (Human)
Chr.	Chromosome 2 (human)
Band	2q11.2	Start	99,318,982 bp
Band	2q11.2	End	99,340,702 bp

Gene location (Mouse)
Chr.	Chromosome 1 (mouse)
Band	1|1 B	Start	38,024,270 bp
Band	1|1 B	End	38,036,974 bp
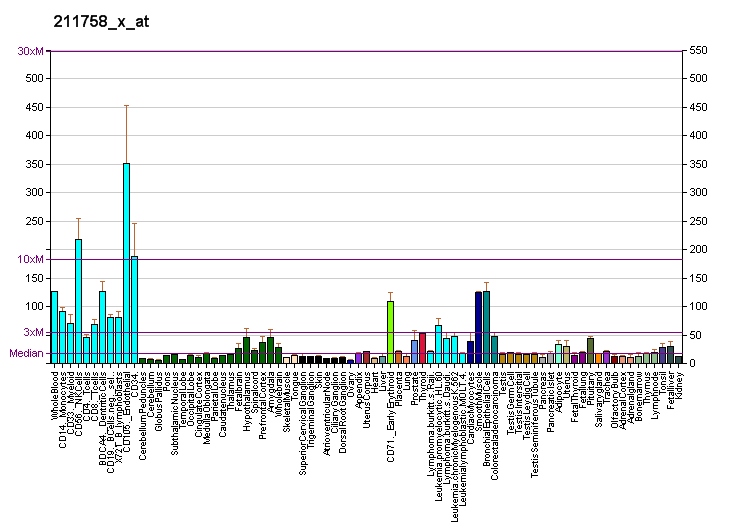

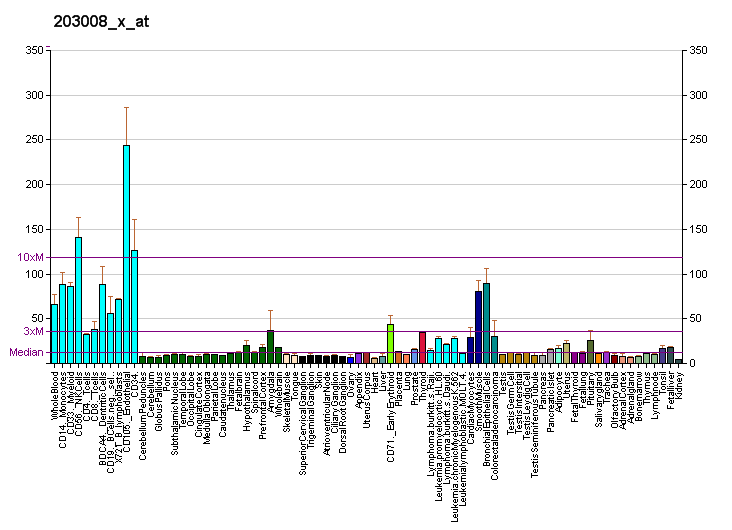
RNA expression pattern
Bgee	Human / Mouse (ortholog); Top expressed in: oocyte; epithelium of nasopharynx; hair follicle; endothelial cell; secondary oocyte; gonad; oral cavity; skin of hip; islet of Langerhans; right ventricle / Top expressed in: blastocyst; morula; zygote; ventricular zone; esophagus; intestinal villus; Ileal epithelium; spermatid; tail of embryo; embryo; More reference expression data
BioGPS	More reference expression data
Gene ontology
Molecular function	protein binding; queuine tRNA-ribosyltransferase activity; cadherin binding
Cellular component	cytoplasm; centrosome; midbody; cytoskeleton; nucleus; microtubule organizing center; cellular component; cytosol
Biological process	queuosine biosynthetic process; cell redox homeostasis; biological process
Sources:Amigo / QuickGO
Orthologs
Databases	NCBI: entry; OMA: entry
Species	Human	Mouse
Entrez	10190	98258
Ensembl	ENSG00000115514	ENSMUSG00000058407
UniProt	O14530	Q9CQ79
RefSeq (mRNA)	NM_005783	NM_172054
RefSeq (protein)	NP_005774	NP_742051
Location (UCSC)	Chr 2: 99.32 – 99.34 Mb	Chr 1: 38.02 – 38.04 Mb
PubMed search
- Wikidata
View/Edit Human	View/Edit Mouse

Thioredoxin domain-containing protein 9 is a protein that in humans is encoded by the TXNDC9 gene.

The protein encoded by this gene is a member of the thioredoxin family. The exact function of this protein is not known but it is associated with cell differentiation.
