= Iris muscle =

Iris muscle may refer to:

- Iris sphincter muscle
- Iris dilator muscle
