= Accommodation reflex =

Reflex action of the human eye

Light from a single point of a distant object and light from a single point of a near object being brought to a focus through accommodation.

The accommodation reflex (also known as the accommodation-convergence reflex) is a reflex action of the eye, in response to focusing on a near object, then looking at a distant object (or vice versa), comprising coordinated changes in vergence, lens shape (accommodation) and pupil size. It is dependent on cranial nerve II (afferent limb of reflex), superior centers (interneuron) and cranial nerve III (efferent limb of reflex). The change in the shape of the lens is controlled by ciliary muscles inside the eye. Changes in contraction of the ciliary muscles alter the focal distance of the eye, causing nearer or farther images to come into focus on the retina; this process is known as accommodation. The reflex, controlled by the parasympathetic nervous system, involves three responses: pupil constriction, lens accommodation, and convergence.

A near object (for example, a computer screen) subtends a large area in the visual field, i.e. the eyes receive light from wide angles. When moving focus from a distant to a near object, the eyes converge. The ciliary muscle constricts making the lens thicker, shortening its focal length. The pupil constricts in order to prevent strongly diverging light rays hitting the periphery of the cornea and the lens from entering the eye and creating a blurred image.

== Pathway ==
Information from the light on each retina is taken to the occipital lobe via the optic nerve and optic radiation (after a synapse in the lateral geniculate body of the posterior thalamus), where it is interpreted as vision. The peristriate area 19 interprets accommodation, and sends signals via the Edinger–Westphal nucleus and the third cranial nerve to the ciliary muscle, the medial rectus muscle and (via parasympathetic fibres) the sphincter pupillae muscle.

== Pupil constriction and lens accommodation ==
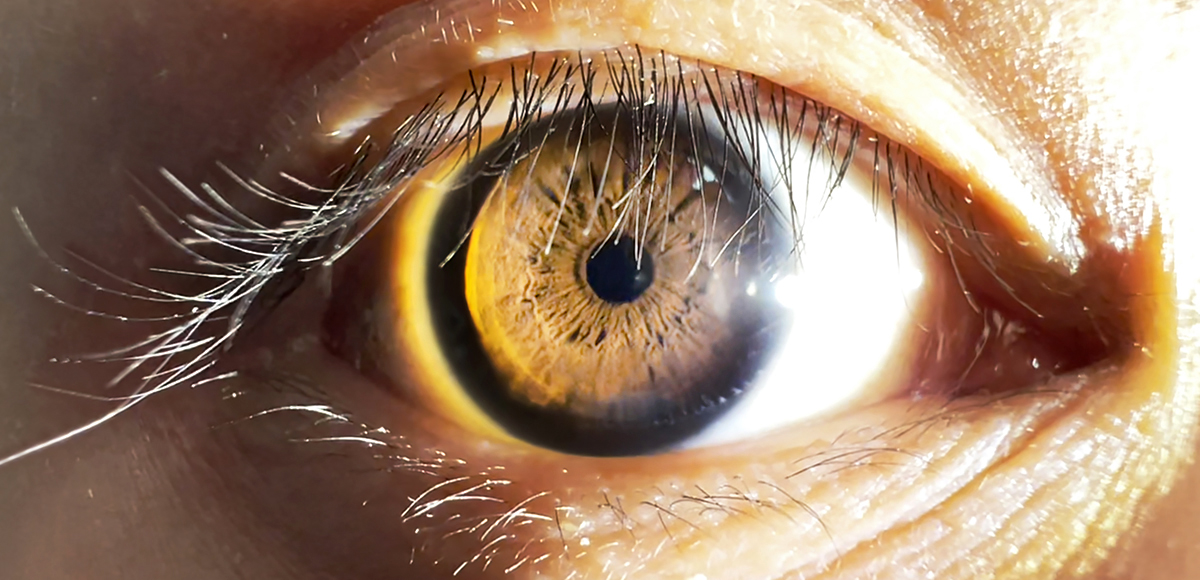
The pupil constricts when accommodation is initiated

During the accommodation reflex, the pupil constricts to increase the depth of focus of the eye by blocking the light scattered by the periphery of the cornea. The lens then increases its curvature to become more biconvex, thus increasing refractive power. The ciliary muscles are responsible for the lens accommodation response.

== Convergence ==
Convergence is the ability of the eye to simultaneously demonstrate inward rotation of both eyes toward each other. This is helpful in effort to make focus on near objects clearer. Three reactions occur simultaneously; the eyes adduct, the ciliary muscles contract, and the pupils become smaller. This action involves the contraction of the medial rectus muscles of the two eyes and relaxation of the lateral rectus muscles. The medial rectus attaches to the medial aspect of the eye and its contraction adducts the eye. The medial rectus is innervated by motor neurons in the oculomotor nucleus and nerve.

== Focus on near objects ==
The refractive index of the eye's cornea-lens system allows the eye to produce sharply focused images on the retina. The refractive power resides mainly in the cornea, but the finer changes in refractive power of the eye are achieved by the lens changing its shape.

As a distant object is brought closer to the eye, the image moves behind the retina, producing blurring at the retina. This blurring is minimized by squeezing the lens to a more spherical shape, which again moves the image back to the plane of the retina.

In order to fixate on a near object, the ciliary muscle contracts around the lens to decrease its diameter and increase its thickness. The suspensory zonules of Zinn relax and the radial tension around the lens is released. This causes the lens to form a more spherical shape achieving greater refractive power.

== Focus on distant objects ==
When the eye focuses on distant objects, the lens holds itself in a flattened shape due to traction from the suspensory ligaments. Ligaments pull the edges of the elastic lens capsule towards the surrounding ciliary body and by opposing the internal pressure within the elastic lens, keep it relatively flattened.

When viewing a distant object, the ciliary muscle relaxes, the diameter of the lens increases and its thickness decreases. The tension along the suspensory ligaments is increased to flatten the lens and decrease the curvature and achieve a lower refractive power.

== Neural circuit ==
Three regions make up the accommodation neural circuit, the afferent limb, the efferent limb and the ocular motor neurons that are between the afferent and efferent limb.

The afferent limb of the circuit
This limb contains the main structures; the retina that contains the retinal ganglion axons in the optic nerve, chiasm and tract, the lateral geniculate body, and the visual cortex.
The efferent limb of the circuit
This limb includes Edinger-Westphal nucleus and the oculomotor neurons. The main function of the Edinger-Westphal nucleus is to send axons in the oculomotor nerve to control the ciliary ganglion which in turn, sends its axons in the short ciliary nerve to control the iris and the ciliary muscle of the eye. The oculomotor neurons functions to send its axons in the oculomotor nerve, to control the medial rectus, and converge the two eyes.
Ocular motor control neurons
Neurons that are interposed between the afferent and efferent limbs of this circuit and include the visual association cortex, which determines the image is "out-of-focus, and sends corrective signals via the internal capsule and crus cerebri to the supraoculomotor nuclei. It also includes the supraoculomotor nuclei (located immediately superior to the oculomotor nuclei) that generates motor control signals that initiate the accommodation response and sends these control signals bilaterally to the oculomotor complex.

== See also ==
- Presbyopia
- Vergence-Accommodation Conflict
