= Short ciliary nerves =

Nerves of the orbit around the eye

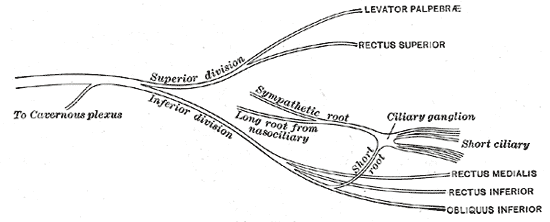
- Plan of oculomotor nerve. (Short ciliary labeled at center right.)

Details
- From: Ciliary ganglion

Identifiers
- Latin: nervi ciliares breves
- TA98: A14.3.02.005
- TA2: 6664
- FMA: 75474

The short ciliary nerves are nerves of the orbit around the eye. They are branches of the ciliary ganglion. They supply parasympathetic and sympathetic nerve fibers to the ciliary muscle, iris, and cornea. Damage to the short ciliary nerve may result in loss of the pupillary light reflex, or mydriasis.

== Structure ==
The short ciliary nerves are branches of the ciliary ganglion. They arise from the forepart of the ganglion in two bundles connected with its superior and inferior angles. The lower bundle is larger than the upper bundle. These split into between 6 and 10 filaments.

They run forward with the ciliary arteries in a wavy course. One bundle is set above the optic nerve, while the other bundle is set below it. They are accompanied by the long ciliary nerves from the nasociliary.

They pierce the sclera at the back part of the bulb of the eye, pass forward in delicate grooves on the inner surface of the sclera, and are distributed to the ciliary muscle, iris, and cornea.

== Function ==
The short ciliary nerves contain both parasympathetic and sympathetic nerve fibers. The parasympathetic fibers arise from the Edinger-Westphal nucleus and synapse in the ciliary ganglion via the oculomotor nerve, the postganglionic parasympathetics leave the ciliary ganglion in the short ciliary nerve and supply the ciliary body and iris. The sympathetic fibers are provided by the superior cervical ganglion and reach the ganglion either as branches of the nasociliary nerve or directly from the extension of the plexus on the ophthalmic artery (sympathetic branch to ciliary ganglion). The sympathetics are non-specific and provide vasoconstriction of the globe.

== Clinical significance ==
Damage to the short ciliary nerve may result in loss of the pupillary light reflex, or mydriasis.

== Additional images ==
Scheme showing sympathetic and parasympathetic innervation of the pupil and sites of lesion in a Horner's syndrome.

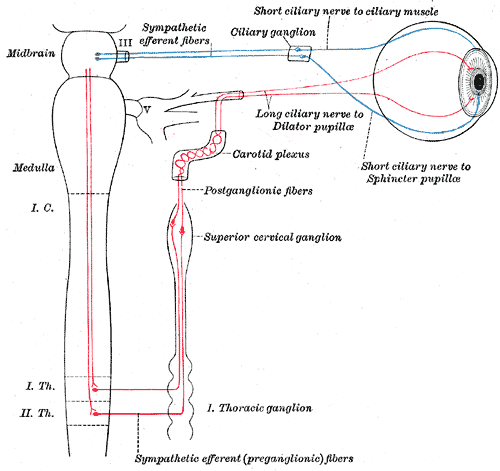
Sympathetic connections of the ciliary and superior cervical ganglia.

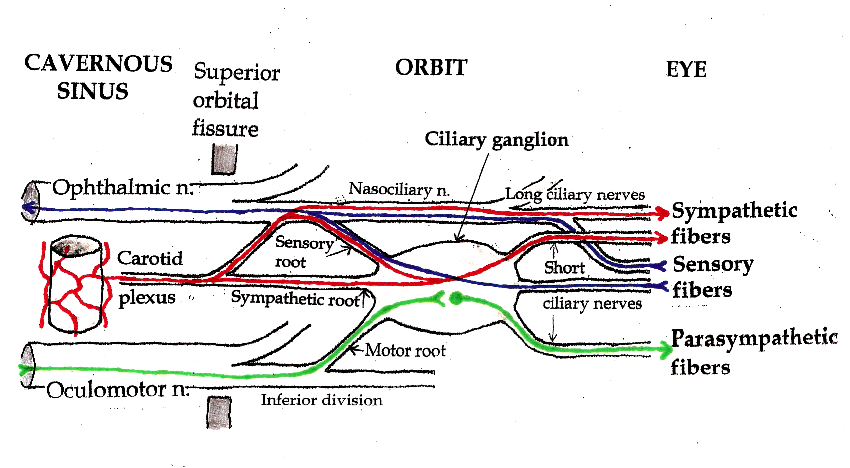
Pathways in the ciliary ganglion.

== See also ==
- Long ciliary nerves
