= Oculomotor nerve palsy =

- Other names: Third nerve palsy
- Eye nerves diagram
- Specialty: Ophthalmology, neurology

Oculomotor nerve palsy or oculomotor neuropathy is an eye condition resulting from damage to the third cranial nerve or a branch thereof. As the name suggests, the oculomotor nerve supplies the majority of the muscles controlling eye movements (four of the six extraocular muscles, excluding only the lateral rectus and superior oblique). Damage to this nerve will result in an inability to move the eye normally. The nerve also supplies the upper eyelid muscle (levator palpebrae superioris) and is accompanied by parasympathetic fibers innervating the muscles responsible for pupil constriction (sphincter pupillae). The limitations of eye movement resulting from the condition are generally so severe that patients are often unable to maintain normal eye alignment when gazing straight ahead, leading to strabismus and, as a consequence, double vision (diplopia).

== Presentation ==
A complete oculomotor nerve palsy will result in a characteristic displacement outward (exotropia) and downward (hypotropia). The outward displacement occurs because the lateral rectus muscle (innervated by the sixth cranial nerve) maintains muscle tone in comparison to the paralyzed medial rectus. The downward displacement occurs because the superior oblique muscle (innervated by the fourth cranial or trochlear nerve) is unantagonized by the paralyzed superior rectus, inferior rectus and inferior oblique. The affected individual will also have a ptosis, or drooping of the eyelid, and mydriasis (pupil dilation).

== Causes ==
Oculomotor palsy can arise as a result of a number of different conditions. Non traumatic pupil-sparing oculomotor nerve palsies are often referred to as a "medical third", with those affecting the pupil being known as a "surgical third".

=== Congenital oculomotor palsy ===
The origins of the vast majority of congenital oculomotor palsies are idiopathic. There is some evidence of a familial tendency to the condition, particularly to a partial palsy involving the superior division of the nerve with an autosomal recessive inheritance. The condition can also result from aplasia or hypoplasia of one or more of the muscles supplied by the oculomotor nerve. It can also occur as a consequence of severe birth trauma.

=== Acquired oculomotor palsy ===
1. Vascular disorders such as diabetes, heart disease, atherosclerosis and aneurysm, particularly of the posterior communicating artery
2. Space occupying lesions or tumours, both malignant and non-malignant
3. Inflammation and infection
4. Trauma
5. Demyelinating disease (multiple sclerosis)
6. Autoimmune disorders such as myasthenia gravis
7. Post-operatively as a complication of neurosurgery
8. Cavernous sinus thrombosis

== Mechanism ==
As the pair of oculomotor nerves arises from different subnuclei in the midbrain, courses through different structures in the brain and branches into superior and inferior divisions after exiting the cavernous sinuses, any lesions along its path will produce different pathological features of the third nerve palsy. The parasympathetic aspect of the nerve (which constricts pupils and thicken the lens) is located on the nerve surface, supplied by pial blood vessels. The nerve's core contains the main trunk of the oculomotor nerve, supplied by vasa vasorum. Thus pathologies affecting the nerve's core without affecting the superficial part of the nerve (thus sparing the pupillary reflex) are known as "medical" oculomotor nerve palsy. The "surgical" type of oculomotor nerve palsy is caused by external structures compressing on the nerve or trauma, which affects the entire nerve, thus affecting pupillary reflex.

Ischemic stroke selectively affects somatic fibers over parasympathetic fibers, while traumatic stroke affects both types more equally. Ischemic stroke affects the vasoneurium, which starts to supply the nerve from outside to inside. As the somatic fibers are located in the inner part of the nerve, these fibres are affected more in the setting of ischemia. A similar mechanism is also accurate for diabetes. Therefore, while almost all forms cause ptosis and impaired movement of the eye, pupillary abnormalities are more commonly associated with trauma and the "surgical third" rather than with ischemia (the "medical third"). A posterior communicating artery aneurysm will generally cause compression of the entire third nerve and will this prevent any nerve signal conduction, affecting the somatic system as well as the autonomic. The compression of the external autonomic fibres renders the pupil nonreactive and leads to the "surgical third" nerve palsy.

Oculomotor palsy can be of acute onset over hours with symptoms of headache when associated with diabetes mellitus. Diabetic neuropathy of the oculomotor nerve in a majority of cases does not affect the pupil. The sparing of the pupil is thought to be associated with the microfasciculation of the fibers that control the pupillomotor function located on the outmost aspect of the occulomotor nerve fibres; these fibres are spared because they are outermost and therefore less prone to ischemic damage than are the innermost fibres.
