= Ciliary muscle =

Eye muscle which is used for focusing

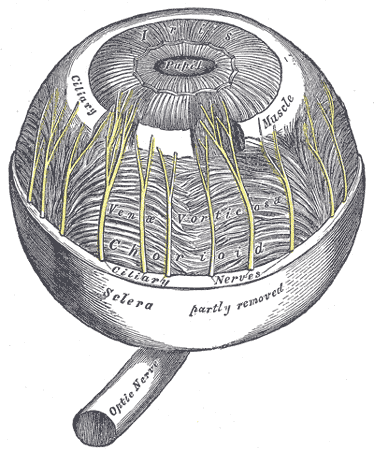
- The choroid and iris. (Ciliary muscle is labeled near top.)

Details
- Pronunciation: UK: /ˈsɪliəri/, US: /ˈsɪliɛri/
- Origin: 1) longitudinal fibers → scleral spur; 2) circular fibers → encircle root of iris
- Insertion: 1) longitudinal fibers → ciliary process, 2) circular fibers → encircle root of iris
- Artery: Long posterior ciliary arteries
- Vein: Vorticose veins
- Nerve: Short ciliary Parasympathetic fibers in the oculomotor nerve (CN-III) synapse in the ciliary ganglion. Parasympathetic postganglionic fibers from the ciliary ganglion travel through short ciliary nerves into the ocular globe.
- Actions: 1) Accommodation, 2) regulation of trabecular meshwork pore sizes

Identifiers
- Latin: musculus ciliaris
- TA98: A15.2.03.014
- TA2: 6770
- FMA: 49151

The ciliary muscle is an intrinsic muscle of the eye formed as a ring of smooth muscle in the eye's middle layer, the uvea (vascular layer). It controls accommodation for viewing objects at varying distances and regulates the flow of aqueous humor into Schlemm's canal. It also changes the shape of the lens within the eye but not the size of the pupil which is carried out by the sphincter pupillae muscle and dilator pupillae.

The ciliary muscle, pupillary sphincter muscle and pupillary dilator muscle sometimes are called intrinsic ocular muscles or intraocular muscles.

== Structure ==
=== Development ===
The ciliary muscle develops from mesenchyme within the choroid and is considered a cranial neural crest derivative.

=== Nerve supply ===
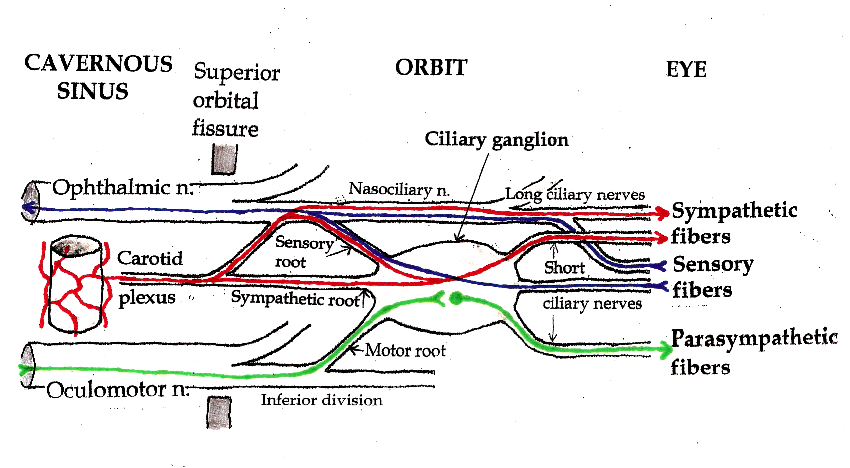
Ciliary ganglion with parasympathetic fibers of ciliary nerves.

The ciliary muscle receives parasympathetic fibers from the short ciliary nerves that arise from the ciliary ganglion. The parasympathetic postganglionic fibers are part of cranial nerve V_{1} (Nasociliary nerve of the trigeminal), while presynaptic parasympathetic fibers to the ciliary ganglia travel with the oculomotor nerve. The postganglionic parasympathetic innervation arises from the ciliary ganglion.

Presynaptic parasympathetic signals that originate in the Edinger–Westphal nucleus are carried by cranial nerve III (the oculomotor nerve) and travel through the ciliary ganglion via the postganglionic parasympathetic fibers which travel in the short ciliary nerves and supply the ciliary body and iris. Parasympathetic activation of the M3 muscarinic receptors causes ciliary muscle contraction. The effect of contraction is to decrease the diameter of the ring of ciliary muscle causing relaxation of the zonule fibers, the lens becomes more spherical, increasing its power to refract light for near vision. This accommodation improves one's ability to see objects that are near.

The parasympathetic tone is dominant when a higher degree of accommodation of the lens is required, such as reading a book.

== Function ==
=== Accommodation ===
The ciliary fibers have circular (Ivanoff), longitudinal (meridional) and radial orientations.

According to Hermann von Helmholtz's theory, the circular ciliary muscle fibers affect zonular fibers in the eye (fibers that suspend the lens in position during accommodation), enabling changes in lens shape for light focusing. When the ciliary muscle contracts, it pulls itself forward and moves the frontal region toward the axis of the eye. This releases the tension on the lens caused by the zonular fibers (fibers that hold or flatten the lens). This release of tension of the zonular fibers causes the lens to become more spherical, adapting to short range focus. Conversely, relaxation of the ciliary muscle causes the zonular fibers to become taut, flattening the lens, increasing the focal distance, increasing long range focus. Although Helmholtz's theory has been widely accepted since 1855, its mechanism still remains controversial. Alternative theories of accommodation have been proposed by others, including L. Johnson, M. Tscherning, and especially Ronald A. Schachar.

=== Trabecular meshwork pore size ===
Contraction and relaxation of the longitudinal fibers, which insert into the trabecular meshwork in the anterior chamber of the eye, cause an increase and decrease in the meshwork pore size, respectively, facilitating and impeding aqueous humour flow into the canal of Schlemm.

== Clinical significance ==
=== Glaucoma ===
Open-angle glaucoma (OAG) and closed-angle glaucoma (CAG) may be treated by muscarinic receptor agonists (e.g., pilocarpine), which cause rapid miosis and contraction of the ciliary muscles, opening the trabecular meshwork, facilitating drainage of the aqueous humour into the canal of Schlemm and ultimately decreasing intraocular pressure.

== History ==
=== Etymology ===
The word ciliary had its origins around 1685–1695. The term cilia originated a few years later in 1705–1715, and is the Neo-Latin plural of cilium meaning eyelash. In Latin, cilia means upper eyelid and is perhaps a back formation from supercilium, meaning eyebrow. The suffix -ary originally occurred in loanwords from Middle English (-arie), Old French (-er, -eer, -ier, -aire, -er), and Latin (-ārius); it can generally mean "pertaining to, connected with", "contributing to", and "for the purpose of". Taken together, cili(a)-ary pertains to various anatomical structures in and around the eye, namely the ciliary body and annular suspension of the lens of the eye.

== Additional images ==
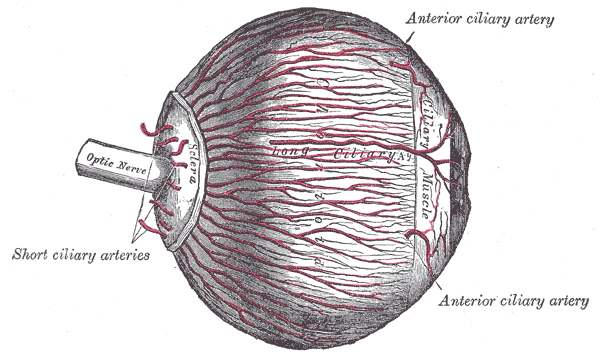
The arteries of the choroid and iris. The greater part of the sclera has been removed.

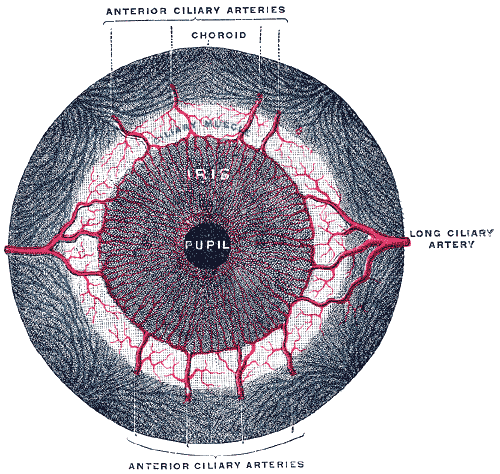
Iris, front view.

== See also ==
- Accommodation reflex
- Cycloplegia
- Extraocular muscle
- Presbyopia
