= Intraocular muscles =

Intrinsic muscles of the eye

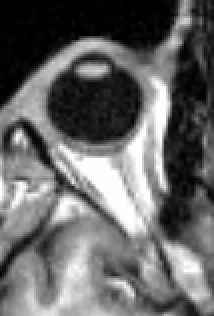
MRI scans of the intrinsic and extraocular muscles.

Intrinsic ocular muscles or intraocular muscles are muscles of the inside of the eye structure.

The intraocular muscles are responsible for adjusting the shape of the lens and the size of the pupil. They're different from the extraocular muscles that are outside of the eye and control the external movement of the eye.

There are three intrisic ocular muscles: the ciliary muscle, pupillary sphincter muscle (sphincter pupillae) and pupillary dilator muscle (dilator pupillae). All of them are smooth muscles.

The ciliary muscle is attached to the zonular fibers and the zonular fibers are the suspensory ligaments of the lens. The ciliary muscle controls accommodation by altering the shape of the lens to be able to see an object from near to far.

The pupillary sphincter muscle and pupillary dilator muscle control the iris to adjust the size of the pupil to adjust how much light enters into the eye. The pupillary dilator muscle increases the pupillary diameter and it is arranged radially, but the pupillary sphincter muscle is responsible for the constriction of the pupil's diameter and it encircles the pupil. The pupillary dilation is also called mydriasis, and the constriction of the pupil is also called miosis.

== See also ==
- Extraocular muscle
