= Iris sphincter muscle =

Muscle in the eye which constricts the pupil

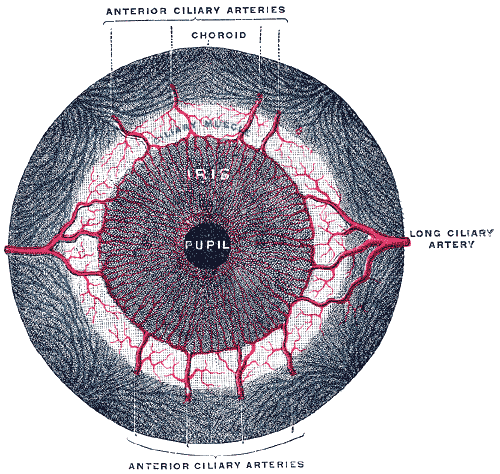
- Iris, front view. (Muscle visible but not labeled.)

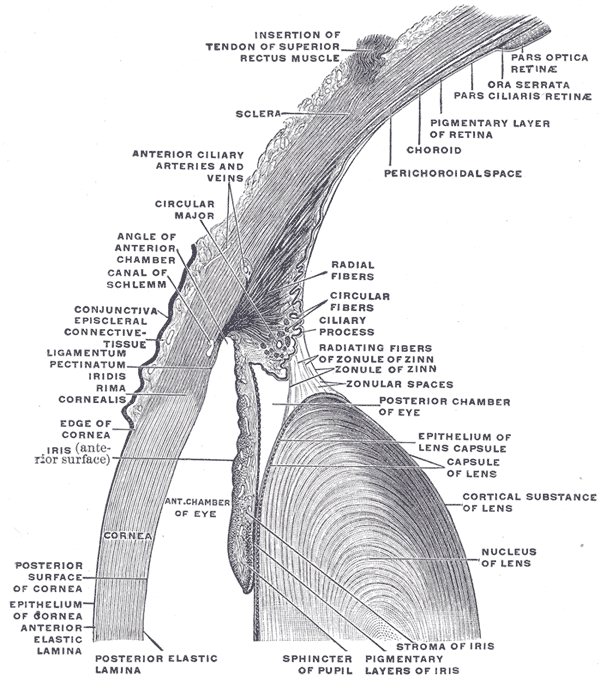
- The upper half of a sagittal section through the front of the eyeball. ("Sphincter of pupil" labeled near bottom-center.)

Details
- Origin: Encircles iris
- Insertion: Encircles iris
- Artery: Long posterior ciliary arteries
- Nerve: Short ciliary nerves
- Actions: Constricts pupil
- Antagonist: Iris dilator muscle

Identifiers
- Latin: musculus sphincter pupillae
- TA98: A15.2.03.029
- TA2: 6762
- FMA: 49157

The iris sphincter muscle (pupillary sphincter, pupillary constrictor, circular muscle of iris, circular fibers) is a muscle in the part of the eye called the iris. It encircles the pupil of the iris, appropriate to its function as a constrictor of the pupil.

The ciliary muscle, pupillary sphincter muscle and pupillary dilator muscle sometimes are called intrinsic ocular muscles or intraocular muscles.

== Comparative anatomy ==
This structure is found in vertebrates and in some cephalopods.

== General structure ==
All the myocytes are of the smooth muscle type.

Its dimensions are about 0.75 mm wide by 0.15 mm thick.

== Mode of action ==
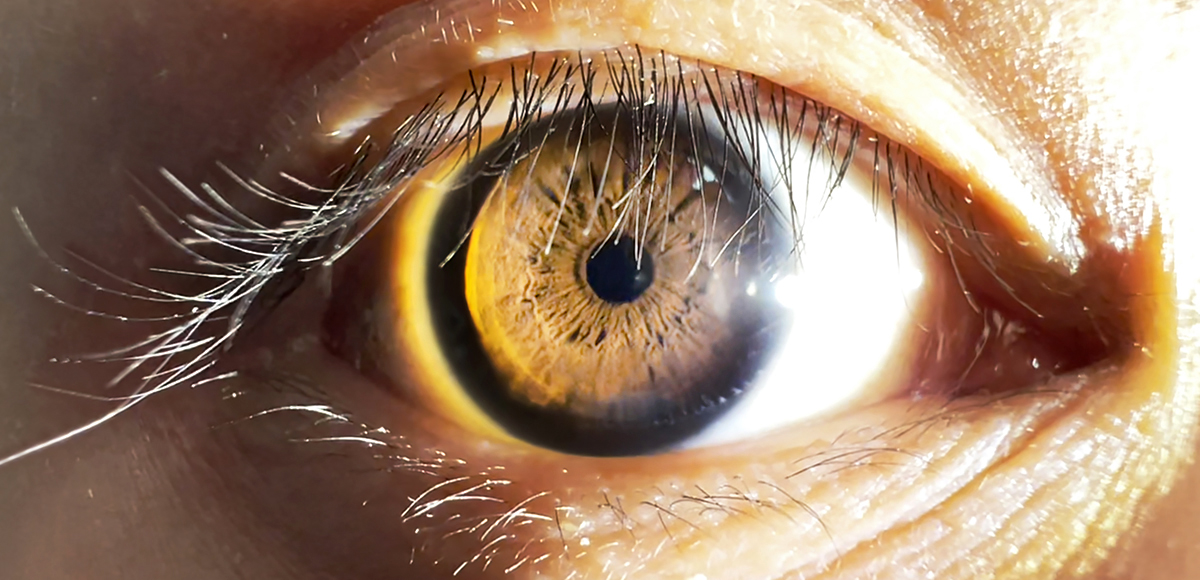
The pupil narrows when the iris sphincter muscle contracts

In humans, it functions to constrict the pupil in bright light (pupillary light reflex) or during accommodation. In some animals, the muscle cells themselves are photosensitive, causing iris action without brain input.

== Innervation ==
It is controlled by parasympathetic postganglionic fibers releasing acetylcholine acting primarily on the muscarinic acetylcholine receptor (M3) of iris sphincter muscle. Preganglionic fibers originate from the Edinger–Westphal nucleus, travel along the oculomotor nerve (CN III), and make nicotinic cholinergic synapses on neurons in the ciliary ganglion. Those neurons' postganglionic parasympathetic fibers then enter the eye through the short ciliary nerves. The short ciliary nerves then run forward and pierce the sclera at the back of the eye, traveling between the sclera and the choroid to innervate the iris sphincter muscle.

== See also ==
- Iris dilator muscle
- Miosis
