= Oculomotor nerve =

Cranial nerve III, for eye movements

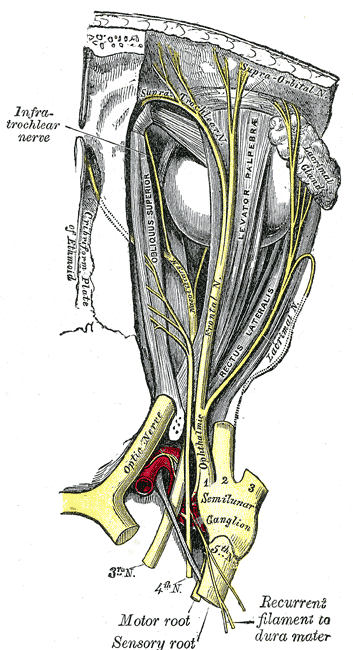
- Nerves of the orbit. Seen from above.

- Inferior view of the human brain, with the cranial nerves labelled.

Details
- From: Oculomotor nucleus, Edinger-Westphal nucleus
- To: Superior branch, inferior branch
- Innervates: Superior rectus, inferior rectus, medial rectus, inferior oblique, levator palpebrae superioris, sphincter pupillae (parasympathetics), ciliaris muscle (parasympathetics)

Identifiers
- Latin: nervus oculomotorius
- MeSH: D009802
- NeuroNames: 488
- TA98: A14.2.01.007
- TA2: 6187
- FMA: 50864

The oculomotor nerve, also known as the third cranial nerve, cranial nerve III, or simply CN III, is a cranial nerve that enters the orbit through the superior orbital fissure and innervates extraocular muscles that enable most movements of the eye and that raise the eyelid. The nerve also contains fibers that innervate the intrinsic eye muscles that enable pupillary constriction and accommodation (ability to focus on near objects as in reading). The oculomotor nerve is derived from the basal plate of the embryonic midbrain. Cranial nerves IV and VI also participate in control of eye movement.

== Structure ==
The oculomotor nerve originates from the third nerve nucleus at the level of the superior colliculus in the midbrain. The third nerve nucleus is located ventral to the cerebral aqueduct, on the pre-aqueductal grey matter. The fibers from the two third nerve nuclei located laterally on either side of the cerebral aqueduct then pass through the red nucleus. From the red nucleus fibers then pass via the substantia nigra to emerge from the substance of the brainstem at the oculomotor sulcus (a groove on the lateral wall of the interpeduncular fossa).

On emerging from the brainstem, the nerve is invested with a sheath of pia mater, and enclosed in a prolongation from the arachnoid. It passes between the superior cerebellar (below) and posterior cerebral arteries (above), and then pierces the dura mater anterior and lateral to the posterior clinoid process, passing between the free and attached borders of the tentorium cerebelli.

It traverses the cavernous sinus, above the other orbital nerves receiving in its course one or two filaments from the cavernous plexus of the sympathetic nervous system, and a communicating branch from the ophthalmic division of the trigeminal nerve. As the oculomotor nerve enters the orbit via the superior orbital fissure it then divides into a superior and an inferior branch.

=== Superior branch ===
The superior branch of the oculomotor nerve or the superior division, the smaller, passes medially over the optic nerve. It supplies the superior rectus and levator palpebrae superioris.

=== Inferior branch ===
The inferior branch of the oculomotor nerve or the inferior division, the larger, divides into three branches.

- One passes beneath the optic nerve to the medial rectus.
- Another, to the inferior rectus.
- The third and longest runs forward between the inferior recti and lateralis to the inferior oblique.
- From the third one, a short thick branch is given off to the lower part of the ciliary ganglion, and forms its short root.

All these branches enter the muscles on their ocular surfaces, with the exception of the nerve to the inferior oblique, which enters the muscle at its posterior border.

=== Nuclei ===
The oculomotor nerve (CN III) arises from the anterior aspect of the mesencephalon (midbrain). There are two nuclei for the oculomotor nerve:

- The oculomotor nucleus originates at the level of the superior colliculus. The muscles it controls are the striated muscle in levator palpebrae superioris and other extraocular muscles except for the superior oblique muscle and the lateral rectus muscle.
- The Edinger–Westphal nucleus supplies parasympathetic fibers to the eye via the ciliary ganglion, and thus controls the sphincter pupillae muscle (affecting pupil constriction) and the ciliary muscle (affecting accommodation).

Sympathetic postganglionic fibres also join the nerve from the plexus on the internal carotid artery in the wall of the cavernous sinus and are distributed through the nerve, e.g., to the smooth muscle of superior tarsal (Mueller's) muscle.

== Function ==
The oculomotor nerve includes axons of type GSE, general somatic efferent, which innervate skeletal muscle of the levator palpebrae superioris, superior rectus, medial rectus, inferior rectus, and inferior oblique muscles. (Innervates all the extrinsic muscles except superior oblique and lateral rectus.)

The nerve also includes axons of type GVE, general visceral efferent, which provide preganglionic parasympathetics to the ciliary ganglion. From the ciliary ganglion postganglionic fibers pass through the short ciliary nerve to the constrictor pupillae of the iris and the ciliary muscles.

== Clinical significance ==
=== Disease ===
Paralysis of the oculomotor nerve, i.e., oculomotor nerve palsy, can arise due to:

- direct trauma,
- demyelinating diseases (e.g., multiple sclerosis),
- increased intracranial pressure (leading to uncal herniation)
  - due to a space-occupying lesion (e.g., brain cancer) or a
  - spontaneous subarachnoid haemorrhage (e.g., berry aneurysm), and
- microvascular disease, e.g., diabetes.

In people with diabetes and older than 50 years of age, an oculomotor nerve palsy, in the classical sense, occurs with sparing (or preservation) of the pupillary reflex. This is thought to arise due to the anatomical arrangement of the nerve fibers in the oculomotor nerve; fibers controlling the pupillary function are superficial and spared from ischemic injuries typical of diabetes. On the converse, an aneurysm which leads to compression of the oculomotor nerve affects the superficial fibers and manifests as a third nerve palsy with loss of the pupillary reflex (in fact, this third nerve finding is considered to represent an aneurysm—until proven otherwise—and should be investigated).

=== Examination ===
==== Eye muscles ====
Cranial nerves III, IV, and VI are usually tested together as part of the cranial nerve examination. The examiner typically instructs the patient to hold his head still and follow only with the eyes a finger or penlight that circumscribes a large "H" in front of the patient. By observing the eye movement and eyelids, the examiner is able to obtain more information about the extraocular muscles, the levator palpebrae superioris muscle, and cranial nerves III, IV, and VI. Loss of function of any of the eye muscles results in ophthalmoparesis.

Since the oculomotor nerve controls most of the eye muscles, it may be easier to detect damage to it. Damage to this nerve, termed oculomotor nerve palsy, is known by its down and out symptoms, because of the position of the affected eye (lateral, downward deviation of gaze).

==== Pupillary reflex ====
The oculomotor nerve also controls the constriction of the pupils and thickening of the lens of the eye. This can be tested in two main ways. By moving a finger toward a person's face to induce accommodation, their pupils should constrict.

Shining a light into one eye should result in equal constriction of the other eye. Fibers from the optic nerves cross over in the optic chiasm with some fibers passing to the contralateral optic nerve tract. This is the basis of the "swinging-flashlight test".

Loss of accommodation and continued pupillary dilation can indicate the presence of a lesion on the oculomotor nerve.

== Additional images ==
Map of the oculomotor nerve.

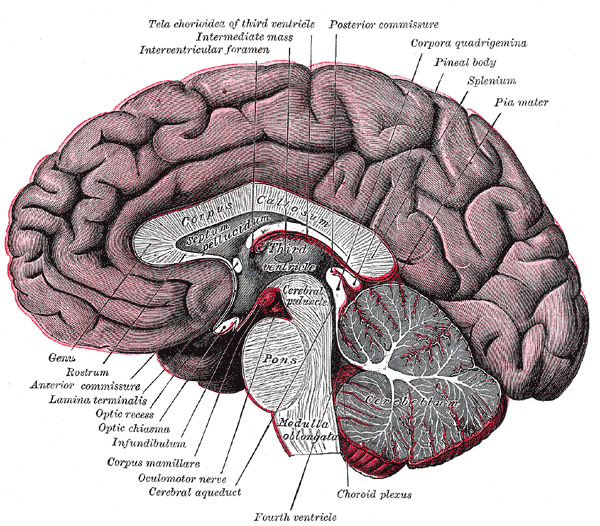
Median sagittal section of brain.

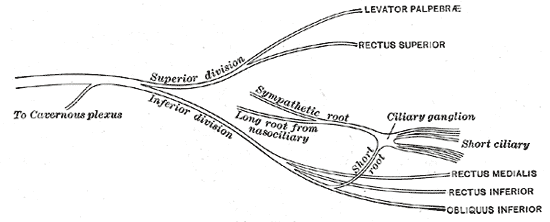
Plan of oculomotor nerve.

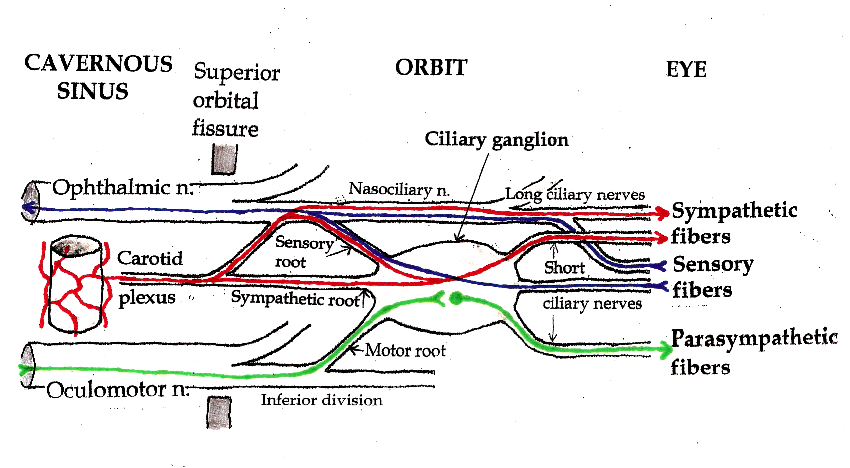
Pathways in the Ciliary Ganglion.

Cross-sectional anatomy of the midbrain showing location of the nucleus of the oculomotor nerve and the Edinger-Westphal nucleus

== See also ==
- Anisocoria
- Cranial nerve
- Oculomotor nucleus
