= Denervation supersensitivity =

Denervation supersensitivity/Denervation hypersensitivity is the sharp increase of sensitivity of postsynaptic membranes to a chemical transmitter after denervation. It is a compensatory change.
