= Iris dilator muscle =

Smooth muscle of the eye

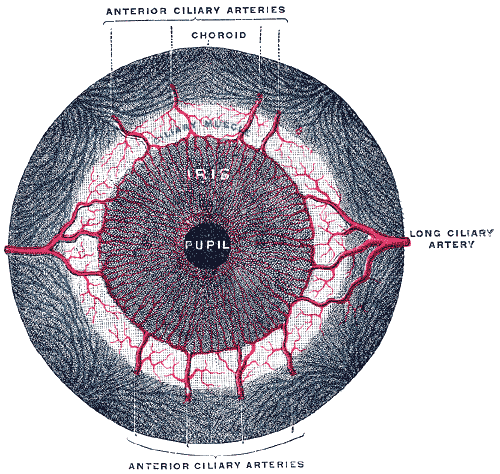
- Iris, front view. (Muscle visible but not labeled.)

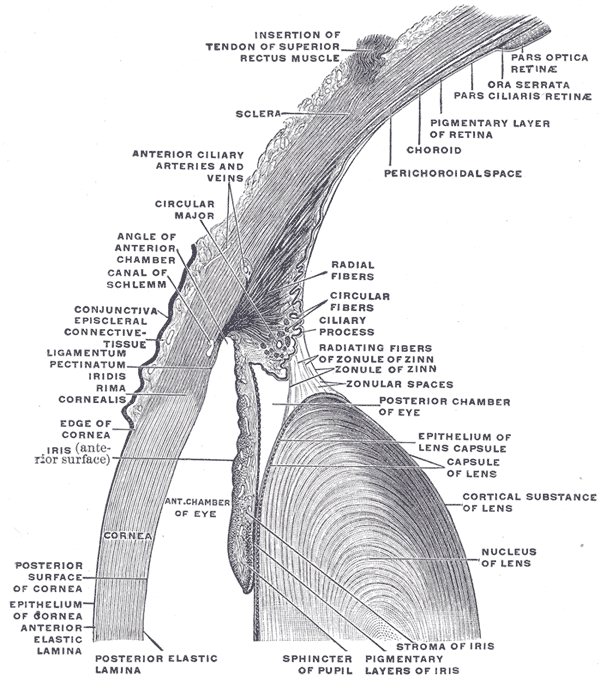
- The upper half of a sagittal section through the front of the eyeball. (Iris dilator muscle is not labeled and not to be confused with "Radiating fibers" labeled near center, which are part of the ciliary muscle.)

Details
- Origin: Outer margins of iris
- Insertion: Inner margins of iris
- Nerve: Long ciliary nerves (sympathetics)
- Actions: Dilates pupil
- Antagonist: Iris sphincter muscle

Identifiers
- Latin: musculus dilatator pupillae
- TA98: A15.2.03.030
- TA2: 6763
- FMA: 49158

The iris dilator muscle (pupil dilator muscle, pupillary dilator, radial muscle of iris, radiating fibers), is a smooth muscle of the eye, running radially in the iris and therefore fit as a dilator. The pupillary dilator consists of a spokelike arrangement of modified contractile cells called myoepithelial cells. These cells are stimulated by the sympathetic nervous system. When stimulated, the cells contract, widening the pupil and allowing more light to enter the eye.

The ciliary muscle, pupillary sphincter muscle and pupillary dilator muscle sometimes are called intrinsic ocular muscles or intraocular muscles.

== Structure ==
=== Innervation ===
It is innervated by the sympathetic system, which acts by releasing noradrenaline, which acts on α1-receptors. Thus, when presented with a threatening stimulus that activates the fight-or-flight response, this innervation contracts the muscle and dilates the pupil, thus temporarily letting more light reach the retina.

The dilator muscle is innervated more specifically by postganglionic sympathetic nerves arising from the superior cervical ganglion as the sympathetic root of ciliary ganglion. From there, they travel via the internal carotid artery through the carotid canal to foramen lacerum. They then enter the middle cranial fossa above foramen lacerum, travel through the cavernous sinus in the middle cranial fossa and then travel with the ophthalmic artery in the optic canal or on the ophthalmic nerve through the superior orbital fissure. From there, they travel with the nasociliary nerve and then the long ciliary nerve. They then pierce the sclera, travel between sclera and choroid to reach the iris dilator muscle. They will also pass through ciliary ganglion and travel in short ciliary nerves to reach the iris dilator muscle.

== Function ==
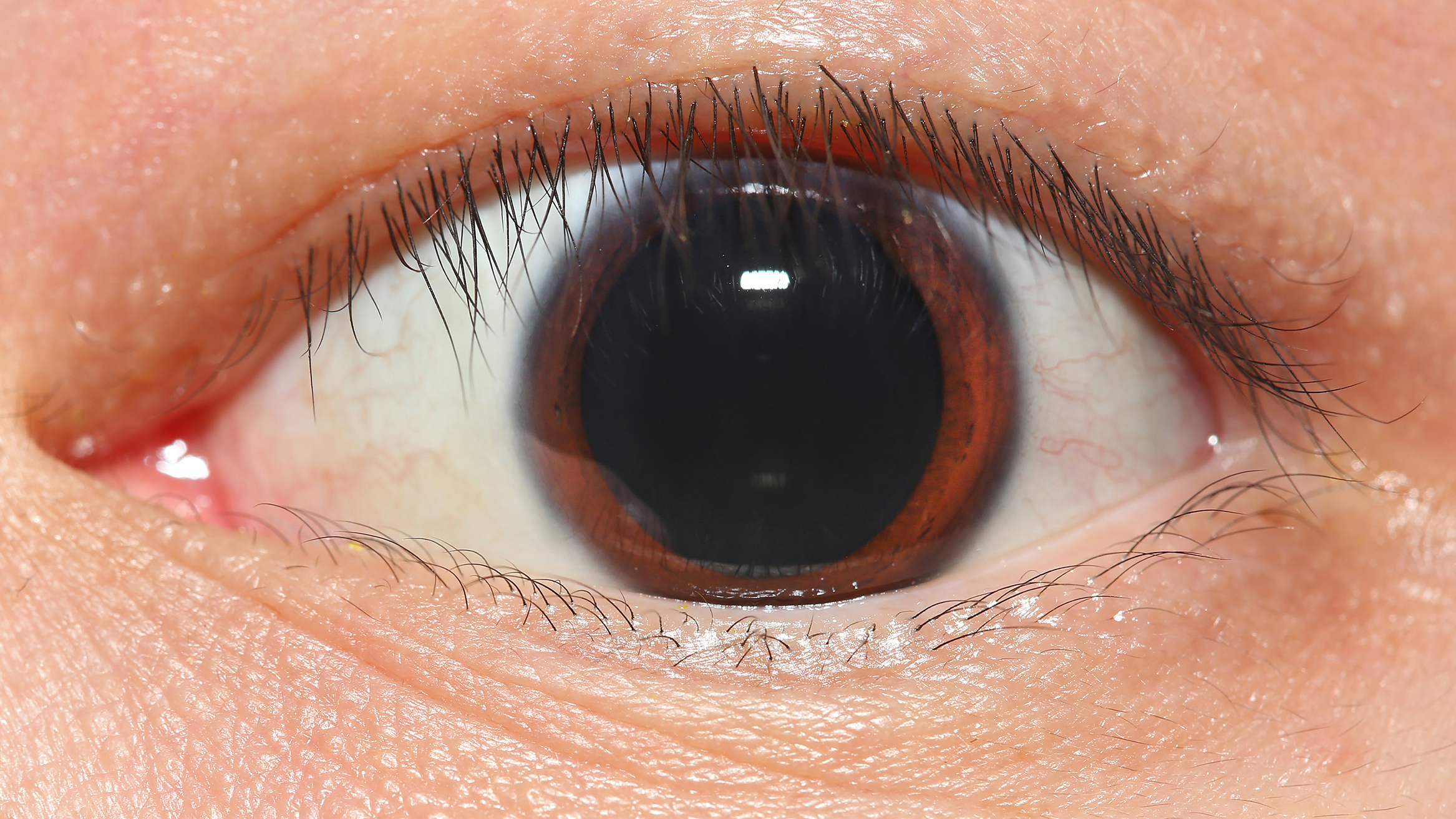
The pupil widens when the iris dilator muscle is stimulated and contracts. An extreme, though natural, case is shown

The pupillary dilator acts to increase the size of the pupil to allow more light to enter the eye. It works in opposition to the pupillary constrictor. Pupil dilation occurs when there is insufficient light for the normal function of the eye, and during heightened sympathetic activity, for example in the "fight-or-flight reflex".

== History ==
=== Etymology ===
The English name dilator pupillae muscle as currently used in the list of English equivalents of the Terminologia Anatomica, the reference-work of the official anatomic nomenclature, can be considered as a corruption of the full Latin expression musculus dilatator pupillae. The full Latin expression exhibits three words that each can be traced back to Roman antiquity. The Classical Latin name musculus is actually a diminutive of the Classical Latin name mus, and can be translated as little mouse. In the medical writings of Aulus Cornelius Celsus we can also find this specific name to refer to a muscle instead of its literal meaning. Latin musculus can be explained by the fact that a muscle looks like a little mouse that moves under the skin. In the writings of Greek philosopher Aristotle the Ancient Greek word for mouse, i.e. μῦς is also used to refer to a muscle.

Dilatator in the Latin expression musculus dilatator pupillae is derived from the classical Latin verb dilatare, to dilate, to spread out. Two possible explanations exist concerning the etymological derivation of this verb. The first explanation considers dilatare as frequentative of differere. The Latin verb differe can mean, to carry different ways, to spread abroad, to scatter, but also to delay. The other explanation considers dilatare as a compound from di- and latus, with the latter word meaning, broad or wide, hence the German name Erweiterer for Latin dilatator.

The expression dilator pupillae muscle, as used in the list of English equivalents of the Terminologia Anatomica, is actually partly Latin, i.e. dilator pupillae, with pupillae (=of the pupil), a noun in the genitive case modifying dilator, a noun in the nominative case, and partly English, i.e. muscle. In previous editions (Nomina Anatomica) this muscle was officially called the musculus dilator pupillae, The Nomina Anatomica as authorized in 1895 in Basel and in 1935 in Jena used the full Latin expression.

== Additional images ==
Scheme showing sympathetic and parasympathetic innervation of the pupil and sites of lesion in a Horner's syndrome.

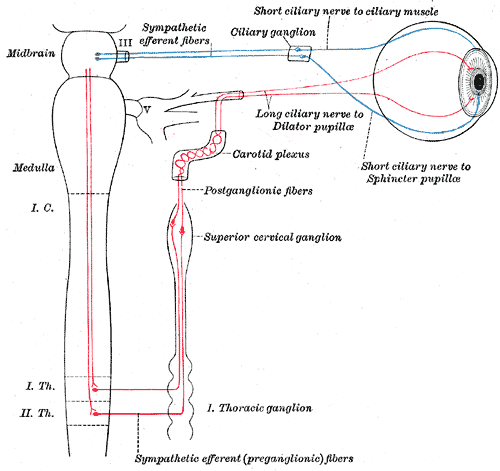
Sympathetic connections of the ciliary and superior cervical ganglia (red) (parasympathetic pathway in blue)

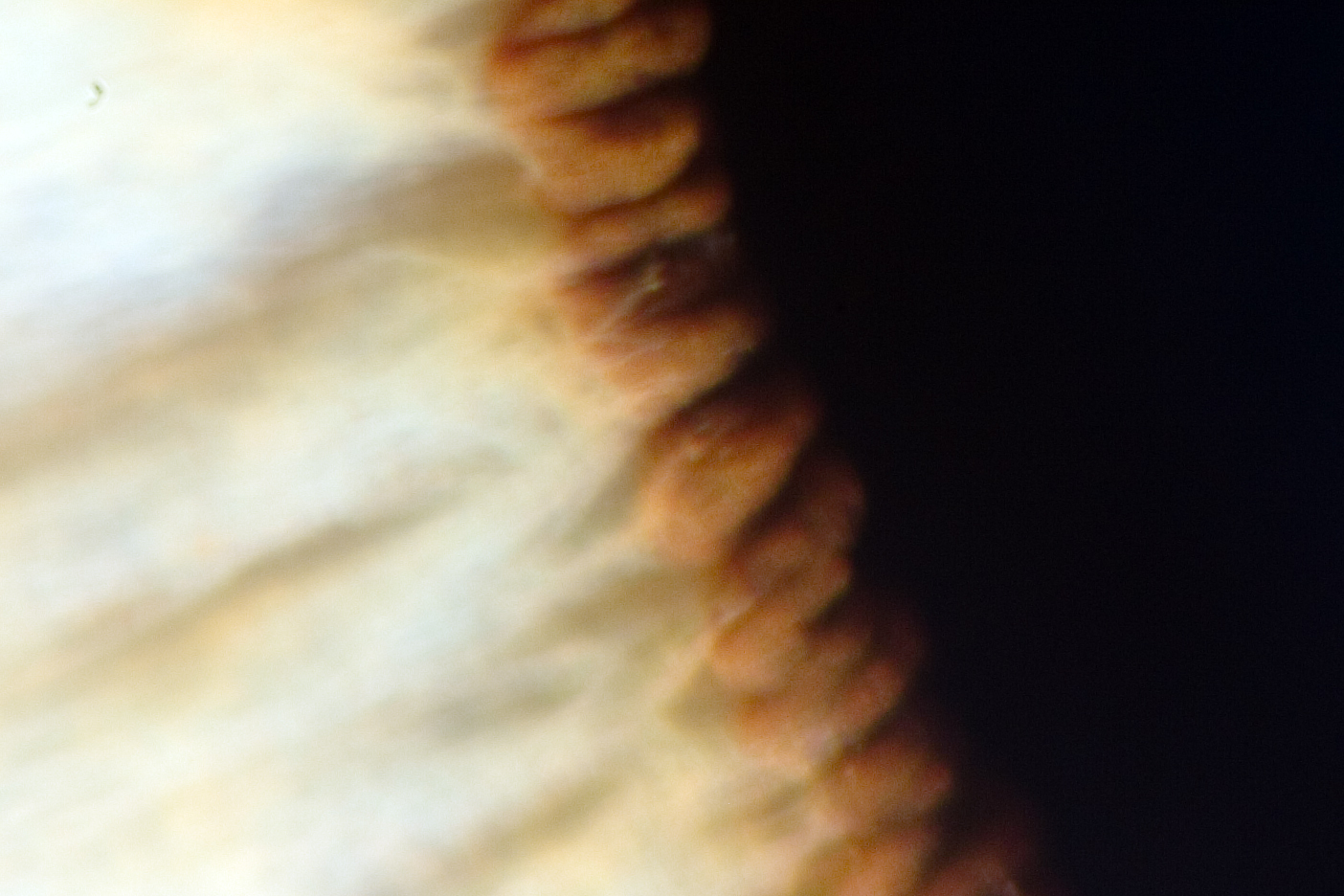
The iris dilator muscle fibers course radially through the iris.

== See also ==
- Iris sphincter muscle
- Mydriasis
- Pupillary response
