= Edinger–Westphal nucleus =

One of two nuclei of the oculomotor nerve

- Section through superior colliculus (unlabeled) showing path of oculomotor nerve.

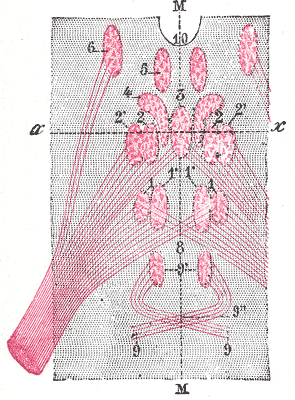
- Figure showing the different groups of cells, which constitute, according to Perlia, the nucleus of origin of the oculomotor nerve.: 1. Posterior dorsal nucleus.; 1’. Posterior ventral nucleus.: 2. Anterior dorsal nucleus.; 2’. Anterior ventral nucleus.: 3. Central nucleus.; 4. Nucleus of Edinger and Westphal.; 5. Antero-internal nucleus.; 6. Antero-external nucleus.; 8. Crossed fibers.; 9. Trochlear nerve, with 9’, its nucleus of origin, and 9", its decussation.; 10. Third ventricle.; M, M. Median line.

Details
- Parts: Provides input to parasympathetic root of ciliary ganglion

Identifiers
- Latin: nuclei accessorii nervi oculomotorii
- MeSH: D065839
- NeuroNames: 498
- NeuroLex ID: birnlex_822

The Edinger–Westphal nucleus, also called the accessory or visceral oculomotor nerve, is one of the two nuclei of the oculomotor nerve (CN III) located in the midbrain. It receives afferents from both pretectal nuclei (which have in turn received afferents from the optic tract). It contains parasympathetic pre-ganglionic neuron cell bodies that synapse in the ciliary ganglion. It contributes the autonomic, parasympathetic component to the oculomotor nerve (CN III), ultimately providing innervation to the iris sphincter muscle and ciliary muscle to mediate the pupillary light reflex and accommodation, respectively.

The Edinger–Westphal nucleus has two parts. The first is of preganglionic fibers (EWpg) that terminate in the ciliary ganglion. The second is of centrally projecting cells (EWcp) that project to a number of brainstem structures.

== Structure ==
The Edinger–Westphal nucleus refers to the adjacent population of non-preganglionic neurons that do not project to the ciliary ganglion, but rather project to the spinal cord, dorsal raphe nucleus, lateral septal nuclei, lateral hypothalamic area and the central nucleus of the amygdala, among other regions.

Unlike the classical preganglionic neurons that contain choline acetyltransferase, neurons of the Edinger–Westphal nucleus contain various neuropeptides such as urocortin and cocaine- and amphetamine-regulated transcript.

Previously, it has been proposed to rename this group of non-preganglionic, neuropeptide-containing neurons to perioculomotor subgriseal neuronal stream (pIII_{SG}). It has also been suggested that the preganglionic oculomotor neurons within the Edinger–Westphal nucleus be referred to as the EWpg, and the neuropeptide-containing neurons be known as the centrally-projecting Edinger Westphal nucleus, or EWcp.

=== Anatomical relations ===
The paired nuclei are posterior to the main motor nucleus (oculomotor nucleus) and anterolateral to the cerebral aqueduct in the rostral midbrain at the level of the superior colliculus.

It is the most rostral of the parasympathetic nuclei in the brain stem.

== Function ==
The Edinger–Westphal nucleus supplies preganglionic parasympathetic fibers to the eye, constricting the pupil, accommodating the lens, and convergence of the eyes.

=== Neurophysiology ===
==== Pupillary light reflex ====
The EWN is located in the midbrain, adjacent to the oculomotor nucleus. It consists of preganglionic parasympathetic neurons that send axons through the oculomotor nerve (CN III) to synapse in the ciliary ganglion. The postganglionic fibers from the ciliary ganglion then innervate the iris sphincter muscle, leading to pupillary constriction (miosis) in response to light.

The EWN also receives modulatory feedback from the locus coeruleus (LC), a noradrenergic center in the pons. The LC integrates information about ambient illumination and cognitive states, adjusting EWN activity accordingly. This interplay allows for dynamic pupil size regulation, balancing light adaptation with cognitive demands such as attention and arousal.

The role of the EWN in the pupillary light reflex is crucial for maintaining visual acuity and protecting retinal photoreceptors from excessive light exposure. Dysfunction of the EWN can lead to neurological deficits, including impaired pupillary reflexes seen in conditions such as diabetic autonomic neuropathy, oculomotor nerve palsy, and neurodegenerative disorders.

== Research ==
It has also been implicated in the mirroring of pupil size in sad facial expressions. When seeing a sad face, participants' pupils dilated or constricted to mirror the face they saw, which predicted both how sad they perceived the face to be, as well as activity within this region.

== Eponym ==
The nucleus is named for both Ludwig Edinger, from Frankfurt, who demonstrated it in the fetus in 1885, and for Karl Friedrich Otto Westphal, from Berlin, who demonstrated it in the adult in 1887.

== Additional images ==
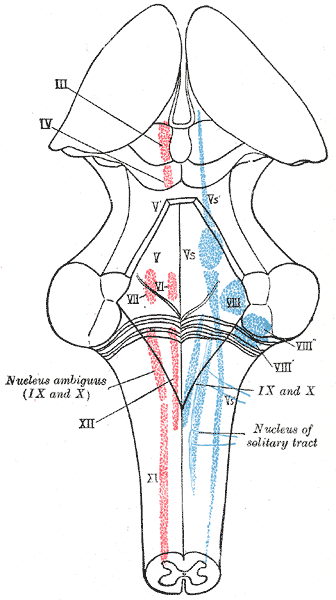
The cranial nerve nuclei schematically represented; dorsal view. Motor nuclei in red; sensory in blue.

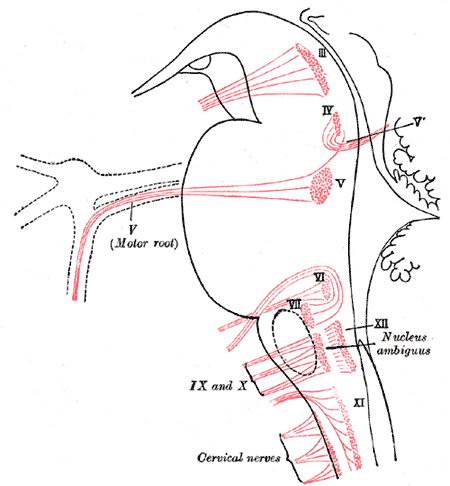
Nuclei of origin of cranial motor nerves schematically represented; lateral view.

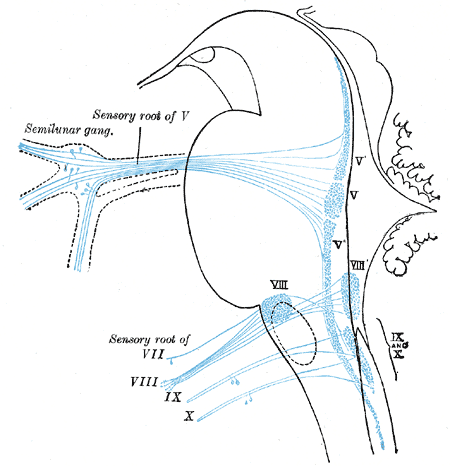
Primary terminal nuclei of the afferent (sensory) cranial nerves schematically represented; lateral view.

== See also ==
- Perlia's nucleus
