= Blurred vision =

Medical condition in humans where their vision is blurry

- Specialty: Ophthalmology, optometry
- Causes: Refractive error

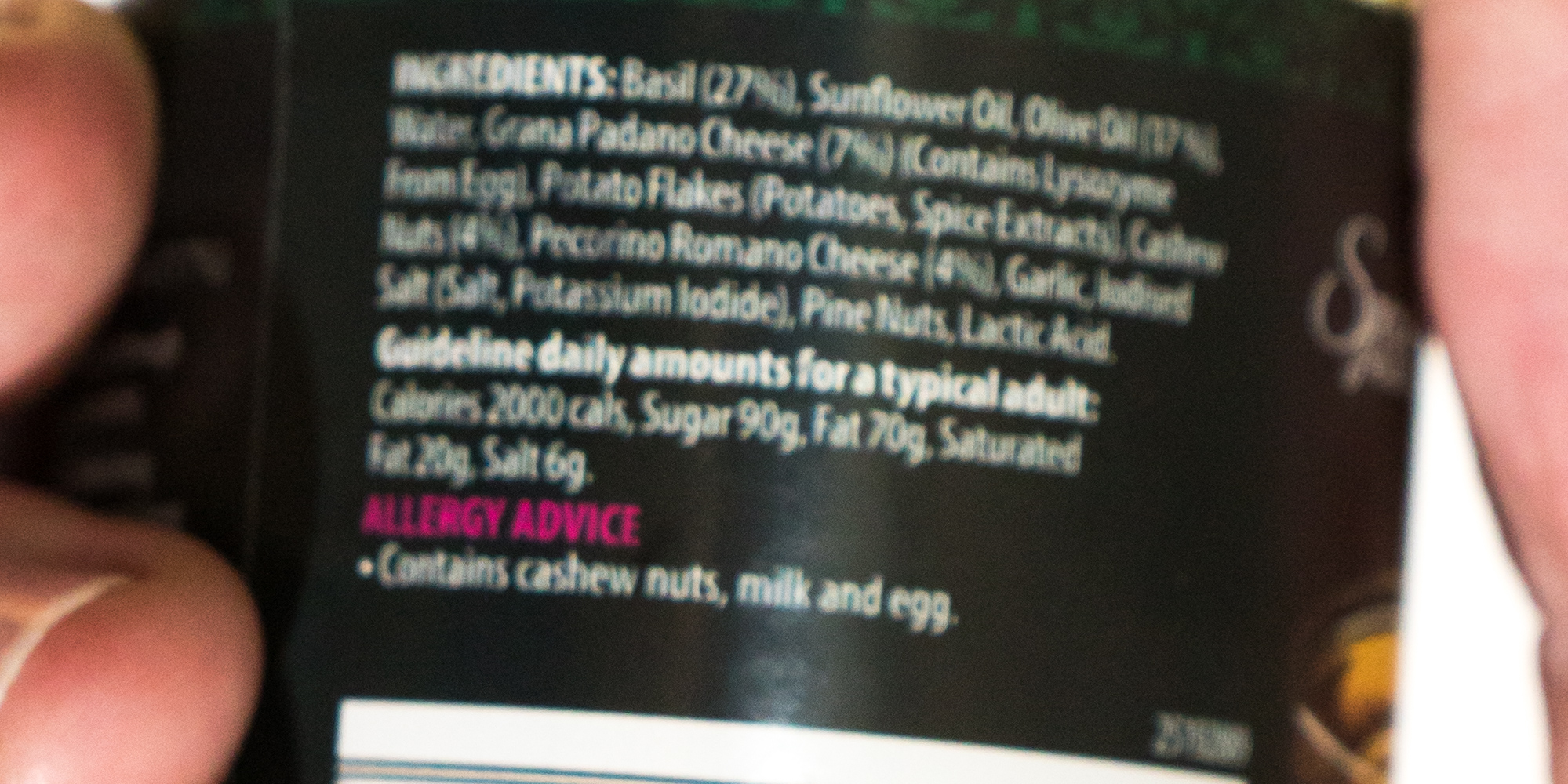
An example of blurred vision

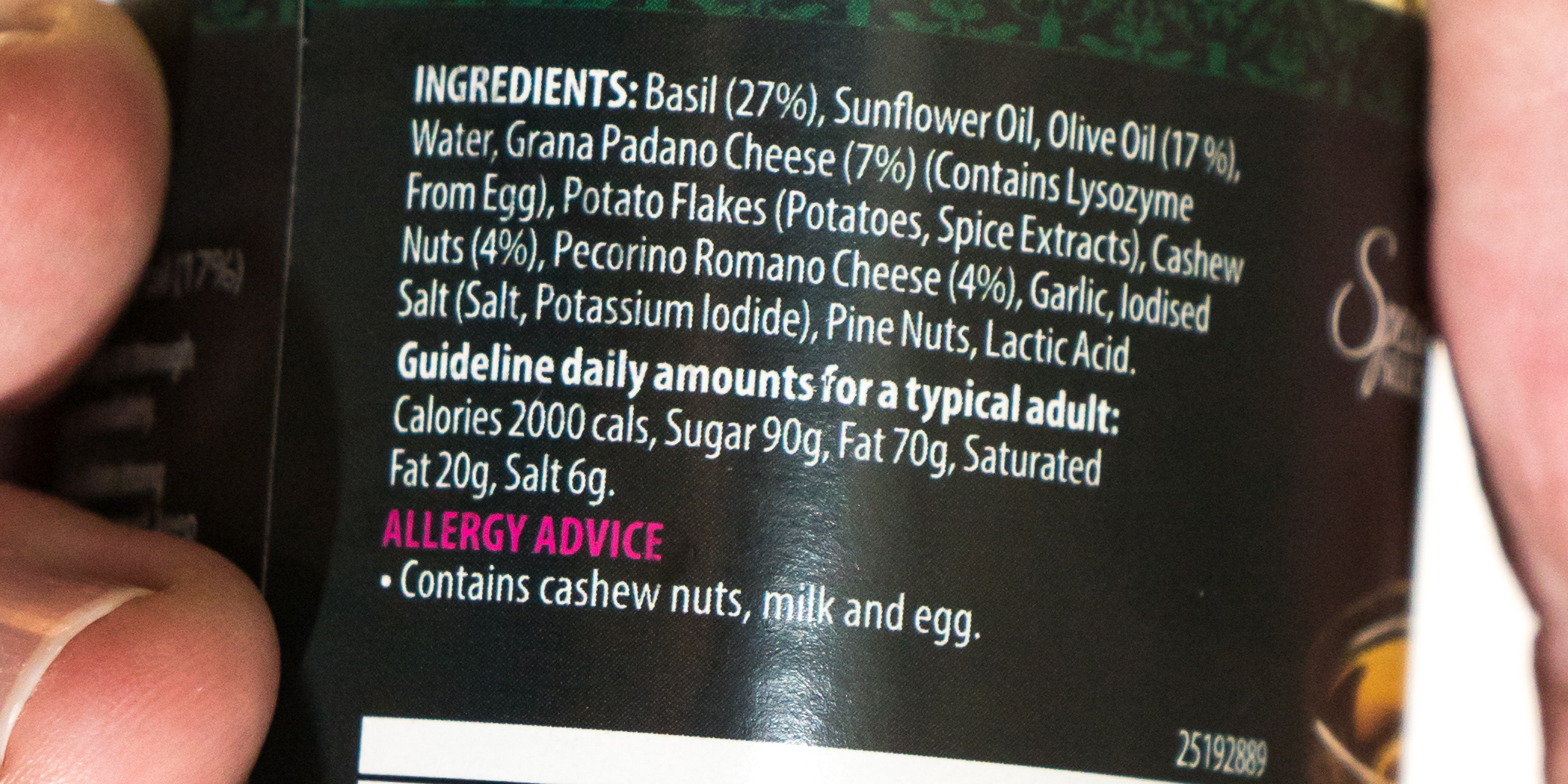
Compared to healthy vision

Blurred vision is an ocular symptom where vision becomes less precise and there is added difficulty to resolve fine details, creating a "blurry" view.

Temporary blurred vision may involve dry eyes, eye infections, alcohol poisoning, hypoglycemia, or low blood pressure. Other medical conditions may include refractive errors such as myopia, high hypermetropia, and astigmatism, amblyopia, presbyopia, pseudomyopia, diabetes, cataract, pernicious anemia, vitamin B_{12} deficiency, thiamine deficiency, glaucoma, retinopathy, hypervitaminosis A, migraine, Sjögren's syndrome, floater, macular degeneration, and can be a sign of stroke or brain tumor.

== Causes ==
There are many causes of blurred vision:

- Refractive errors: Uncorrected refractive errors like myopia, high hypermetropia, and astigmatism will cause distance vision blurring. It is one of the leading cause of visual impairment worldwide. Unless there is no associated amblyopia, visual blur due to refractive errors can be corrected to normal using corrective lenses or refractive surgeries.
- Presbyopia due to physiological insufficiency of accommodation (accommodation tends to decrease with age) is the main cause of defective near vision in the elderly. Other causes of defective near vision include accommodative insufficiency, paralysis of accommodation etc.
- Pseudomyopia due to accommodation anomalies like accommodative excess, accommodative spasm etc. cause distance vision blurring.
- Alcohol intoxication can cause blurred vision.
- Use of cycloplegic drugs like atropine or other anticholinergics cause visual blur due to paralysis of accommodation.
- Cataracts: Cloudiness over the eye's lens, cause blurring of vision, halos around lights, and sensitivity to glare. It is also the main cause of blindness worldwide.
- Glaucoma: Increased intraocular pressure (pressure in the eye) cause progressive optic neuropathy that leads to optic nerve damage, visual field defects and blindness. Sometimes glaucoma may occur without increased intraocular pressure also. Some glaucomas (e.g. open angle glaucoma) cause gradual loss of vision and some others (e.g. angle closure glaucoma) cause sudden loss of vision. It is one of the leading cause of blindness worldwide.
- Diabetes: Poorly controlled blood sugar can lead to temporary swelling of the lens of the eye, resulting in blurred vision. While it resolves if blood sugar control is reestablished, it is believed repeated occurrences promote the formation of cataracts (which are not temporary).
- Retinopathy: If left untreated, any type of retinopathy (including diabetic retinopathy, hypertensive retinopathy, sickle cell retinopathy, anemic retinopathy, etc.) can damage retina and lead to visual field defects and blindness.
- Hypervitaminosis A: Excess consumption of vitamin A can cause blurred vision.
- Macular degeneration: Macular degeneration cause loss of central vision, blurred vision (especially while reading), metamorphopsia (seeing straight lines as wavy), and colors appearing faded. Macular degeneration is the third main cause of blindness worldwide, and is the main cause of blindness in industrialised countries.
- Eye infection, inflammation, or injury.
- Sjögren's syndrome, a chronic autoimmune inflammatory disease that destroys moisture producing glands, including lacrimal gland and leads to dry eye and visual blur.
- Floaters: Tiny particles drifting across the eye. Although often brief and harmless, they may be a sign of retinal detachment.
- Retinal detachment: Symptoms include floaters, flashes of light across your visual field, or a sensation of a shade or curtain hanging on one side of your visual field.
- Optic neuritis: Inflammation of the optic nerve from infection or multiple sclerosis may cause blurring of vision. There may be pain while moving the eye or touching it through the eyelid.
- Stroke or transient ischemic attack
- Brain tumor
- Toxocara: A parasitic roundworm that can cause blurred vision.
- Bleeding into the eye
- Temporal arteritis: Inflammation of an artery in the brain that supplies blood to the optic nerve.
- Migraine headaches: Spots of light, halos, or zigzag patterns are common symptoms prior to the start of the headache. A retinal migraine is when you have only visual symptoms without a headache.
- Reduced blinking: Lid closure that occurs too infrequently often leads to irregularities of the tear film due to prolonged evaporation, thus resulting in disruptions in visual perception.
- Carbon monoxide poisoning: Reduced oxygen delivery can affect many areas of the body including vision. Other symptoms caused by CO include vertigo, hallucination and sensitivity to light.

== See also ==
- Functional visual loss
