= Cyclopentolate =

Pair of enantiomers

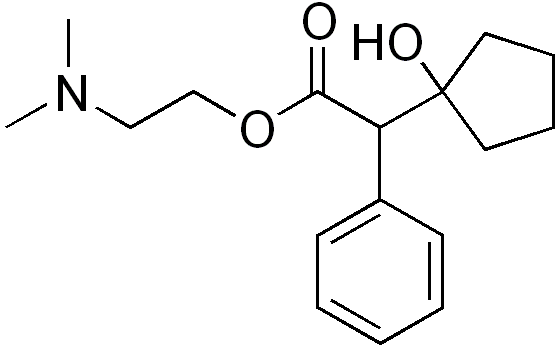

Clinical data
- Pregnancy category: C
- Routes of administration: Topical
- ATC code: S01FA04 (WHO)

Legal status
- Legal status: BR: Class C1 (Other controlled substances)

Identifiers
- IUPAC name: (RS)-2-(dimethylamino)ethyl (1-hydroxycyclopentyl)(phenyl)acetate
- CAS Number: 512-15-2
- PubChem CID: 2905
- DrugBank: DB00979
- ChemSpider: 2802
- UNII: I76F4SHP7J
- KEGG: D07759
- ChEBI: CHEBI:4024
- ChEMBL: ChEMBL1200473
- CompTox Dashboard (EPA): DTXSID3048528
- ECHA InfoCard: 100.007.398

Chemical and physical data
- Formula: C_{17}H_{25}NO_{3}
- Molar mass: 291.391 g·mol^{−1}
- 3D model (JSmol): Interactive image
- SMILES: O=C(OCCN(C)C)C(c1ccccc1)C2(O)CCCC2
- InChI: InChI=1S/C17H25NO3/c1-18(2)12-13-21-16(19)15(14-8-4-3-5-9-14)17(20)10-6-7-11-17/h3-5,8-9,15,20H,6-7,10-13H2,1-2H3; Key:SKYSRIRYMSLOIN-UHFFFAOYSA-N

Cyclopentolate is a muscarinic antagonist. It is commonly used as an eye drop during pediatric eye examinations to dilate the eye (mydriatic) and prevent the eye from focusing/accommodating (cycloplegic). Cyclopentolate or atropine can also be administered to reverse muscarinic and central nervous system effects of indirect cholinomimetic (anti-AChase) administration.

It is on the World Health Organization's List of Essential Medicines.

After instillation of cyclopentolate, pupil dilation (mydriasis) typically lasts up to 24 hours, while paralysis of the ciliary muscle (cycloplegia) typically lasts 6-24 hours. During this time, patients may be more light sensitive than normal and may notice close objects blurred (and possibly distant objects blurred, depending on the patient's visual system). Cyclopentolate is often chosen as a milder, shorter-lasting, cycloplegic alternative to atropine, another cycloplegic agent which lasts much longer. Tropicamide is an even shorter-lasting cycloplegic than cyclopentolate, but is less reliable for finding latent hyperopia. Cyclopentolate drops act rapidly to dilate the pupil.

The side and adverse effects of cyclopentolate are similar to the side and adverse effects of other anticholinergic medications. Because of that, extra caution should be taken when prescribing cyclopentolate to patients who are already taking other anticholinergic drugs. A possible ocular (eye-related) side effect is increase in pressure inside the eye, which is of particular concern when there is a predisposition toward or a presence of glaucoma. Other ocular side effects can include burning sensations, discomfort with bright light (photophobia), blurred vision, irritation, inflammation of the eye mucous membranes (conjunctivitis), inflammation of the cornea of the eye (keratitis), and other issues. Nonocular (not eye-related) side and adverse effects can include neuropsychiatric symptoms. like subtle concentration and memory problems, subtle decision-making problems, drowsiness, and more pronounced disorientation to time and place, confusion, disturbances of speech and movement, hyperactivity, restlessness, and seizures. Temporary psychosis can develop that includes hallucinations, particularly when higher doses are used in children or older adults on other anticholinergic medications. Patients with dementia of the Alzheimer's type can experience worsening of their dementia symptoms. Additional side and adverse effects can include skin flushing, skin rashes, gastrointestinal problems, increased heart beat (tachycardia), increased body temperature (hyperpyrexia), blood vessel dilation, urinary retention, dry mouth and reduced sweating, and reduced bronchial secretions. Severe poisoning with cyclopentolate may result in coma, paralysis of breathing, and death. Cyclopentolate derivatives can be used as an antidote for organophosphate poisoning.

Lethality of cyclopentolate has been studied in rodents. The LD50 (the dose at which 50% of animals die from the drug) is approximately 4000 mg/kg in rats and 960 mg/kg in mice. Readily recognizable symptoms of overdose include tachycardia, dizziness, dry mouth, behavioral disturbances, uncoordination, and drowsiness.

Cycloplegia is necessary in cases of suspected latent hyperopia (or "over-focusing") so that an ophthalmologist or optometrist can accurately measure how much a person has to flex their focusing muscle (accommodation) in order to see in the distance and up-close. Correction of latent hyperopia in children can often prevent, or sometimes correct, unwanted eye turns (strabismus), some forms of refractive amblyopia, and may alleviate eye strain or frontal headaches caused by prolonged near-work. Cycloplegia is also helpful in relieving accommodative spasm.

== History ==
Cyclopentolate was first synthesized in 1952 as a chemical analogue of atropine. It was one of several derivatives of an analogue to tropic acid which were tested for pharmacological action "in a search for new and better antispasmodic agents."

Brand names for cyclopentolate include Cyclogyl, Cylate, Mydrilate, and Pentolair.

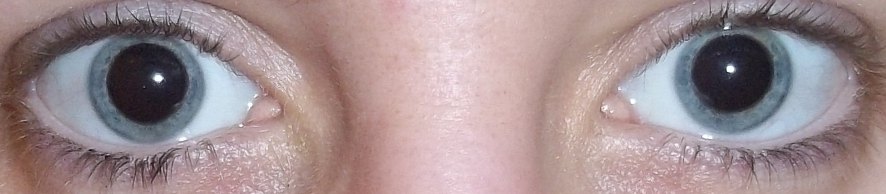
Pupil dilation (mydriasis) caused by cyclopentolate 1% instilled into both eyes
