= Positive relative accommodation =

Measurement in eye examinations

Positive relative accommodation (PRA) in biology, is a measure of the maximum ability to stimulate eye accommodation while maintaining clear, single binocular vision. This measurement is typically obtained by an orthoptist, ophthalmologist or optometrist during an eye examination using a phoropter. After the patient's distance correction is established, she or he is instructed to view small letters on a card 40 cm from the eyes. The examiner adds lenses in −0.25 diopter increments until the patient first reports that they become blurry. The total value of the lenses added to reach this point is the PRA value.

High PRA values (>= 3.50 diopters) are considered to be diagnostic of disorders involving accommodative excess. Those with accommodative insufficiency typically have PRA values below −1.50 diopters.

== See also ==
- Accommodation in fish
- Adaptation (eye)
- Amplitude of accommodation
- Convergence insufficiency
- Mandelbaum effect
- Negative relative accommodation
