= Ocular malingering =

Type of malingering

- Specialty: Ophthalmology, Optometry
- Diagnostic method: Eye examination
- Differential diagnosis: Functional visual loss, Amblyopia

Ocular malingering is a type of malingering in which patients may either simulate a visual complaint or deny having a visual complaint or ophthalmic disease. A person may simulate variety of visual complaints including uniocular or binocular blindness, visual field defect or night blindness. A similar condition is functional visual loss which come under the spectrum of functional neurological disorder or somatic symptom disorder.

== Overview ==
Ocular malingering is seen in a variety of patients despite age sex or ethnicity. Patients may either simulate an ophthalmic disease (positive simulation or positive malingering), or they may deny a visual complaint or ophthalmic disease (negative simulation or negative malingering). The most common malingerer is faking vision loss to gain disability benefits, or attention, among other secondary benefits. A second group of people exaggerates their visual symptoms, knowing they are exaggerating their symptoms but worrying that they may actually have a serious vision problem. The third type of person feels sure that something is wrong with his eyes and tries to help the doctor to identify the disease easily without hiding the symptoms of his disease. The last type of person often finds satisfaction in telling himself that he is blind in one eye, or that he has tunnel vision, after minor injuries. Rarely, a person may pretend to be completely blind in both eyes. Patients may also simulate visual field defects, diplopia, color blindness, night blindness or ocular motility disorders.

People may malinger to get financial benefits from others, to get sympathy from others, to get some particular jobs, or to escape from certain jobs or police cases. Malingering is not considered a psychiatric disorder, but rather a deliberate attempt to deceive and manipulate others for personal gain.

== History taking ==
History taking is very important in assessing ocular malingering. It is very important not to allow any friend or relative into the examination room as the presence of another can influence the patient's behavior and thereby the diagnosis. It is also important that the patient never feels that the examiner suspects the patient is malingering, as this will make the patient more alert.

All complaints, including conflicting ones, as well as all symptoms reported by the patient should be recorded in their own words. Time of entry into the room, state of mind upon entering the room, type of seating, psychological profile and reactions should be recorded. Those records may sometimes be required in future judicial investigations.

== Diagnosis ==
Diagnosis is mainly through eye and vision examination. But a psychological approach based behaviour of the individual and the reaction of the patient during examination should also be noted.

Optometrists and ophthalmologists perform a number of tests to determine if a person has a serious vision loss or if they are lying. The types of tests vary depending on the type of vision loss the patient complains. All ophthalmic sensory and motor functions should be checked, including a visual acuity test, a visual field test, and a color vision test to ensure that there are no other abnormalities. Advanced methods like Optical coherence tomography (OCT) and Frequency Doubling Perimetry (FDP) can also be chosen if needed.

== Types ==
=== Bilateral or binocular blindness ===
Patients may simulate bilateral or binocular blindness. The general behavior of the patient is important in assessing this. If the patient easily enters and walks around the exam room without hesitation, it is a sign of malingering. If a person claims he has bilateral visual impairment, many tests can be done to see if he is lying.

Eye contact effect, identifying and avoiding obstacles, unable to sign when asked, closing their eyes when a hand is suddenly waved towards the patient's face, following mirror image are some common behaviors a malingerer shows. Reading eye chart and gradually increase the size of the letters and ask the patient to read them and testing with a zero power lens in a trial frame may also be used in malingering.

In general, near vision decreases in proportion to the decrease in distance vision. A large discrepancy between near visual acuity and distance acuity indicates that the problem is not organic. Other tests like Optokinetic response, Psychogalvanic test and Preferential looking test, a test that is commonly used to test visual acuity in infants may be used to determine malingering in adults.

=== Uniocular blindness or visual impairment ===
If a person claims that he has defective vision or no vision at all in one eye, if there are no other signs, tests like Convex Lens Test, Prism base down test, Duochrome test, cycloplegic test, etc. can be done to see if the person is malingering.

If there is no refractive error or media opacity that cause disparity in visual acuity between the two eyes, and if there is a true pathology is present, the affected eye may have a Relative afferent pupillary defect.

=== Visual field defects ===
If a person claims that he has defective visual field, if there are no other signs, automated or manual visual field tests including Confrontation testing can be used to rule out defects in the field of vision.

=== Night blindness ===
A person who does not have night blindness may sometimes claim to have night blindness. People may do this to avoid doing certain types of work, to avoid night shifts, to escape police cases etc. Full field Electroretinography is test used to determine if the patient is simulating or not. If combined responses from rods and cones are normal in this test, it may be considered as simulation. Irregular or missed responses may be noticed in other tests like Dark adaptometry and Blue and red discs test.

=== Colour blindness ===
A person have color blindness may sometimes claim to have normal color vision. People can do this to get certain types of jobs that reject color blind people. Tests like Ishihara test, Farnsworth 100 hue, 15 hue tests and anomaloscope can be used in this.

=== Simulating an eye disease ===
Apart from visual problems, sometimes a person may pretend to have a symptom of a disease that they do not have, mimic the symptoms of a disease, exaggerate the symptoms of a mild illness, or create a real illness through self-inflicted injury or mechanical or chemical use.

== Recording ==
Although malingering is not a medical diagnosis, it may be recorded as a "focus of clinical attention" or a "reason for contact with health services".

== History ==
Most cases of visual malingering recorded in history are found in military records, as it was mostly used to avoid mandatory tasks. Malingering was recorded among the Roman legions.
