= Tropicamide/hydroxyamfetamine =

Combination drug

Combination of
- Tropicamide: anticholinergic
- Hydroxyamfetamine: sympathomimetic

Clinical data
- Trade names: Paremyd

Tropicamide/hydroxyamfetamine (trade name Paremyd) is a combination drug used as an ophthalmic solution to induce mydriasis. It consists of:

- Tropicamide (0.25%), an anticholinergic drug
- Hydroxyamfetamine (norpholedrine, 1%), a sympathomimetic drug
