= Accommodative infacility =

- Specialty: Ophthalmology

Accommodative infacility also known as accommodative inertia is the inability to change the accommodation of the eye with enough speed and accuracy to achieve normal function. This can result in visual fatigue, headaches, and difficulty reading. The delay in accurate accommodation also makes vision blurry for a moment when switching between distant and near objects. The duration and extent of this blurriness depends on the extent of the deficit.

== Signs and symptoms ==
Most common symptom of accommodative infacility is difficulty in changing focus from one distance to other.

== Treatment ==
Vision assessment and cycloplegic refraction should be done. If there is any refractive errors, it should be corrected before considering orthoptic treatments. The accommodative infacility is commonly treated with vision therapy/orthoptics; one study found that 12 weeks of treatment had a significant effect on visual accommodation.
