= Cyclospasm =

Contraction of ciliary muscle

Cyclospasm is the contraction or spasm of the ciliary muscle in the eye, in the accommodation of focus for near vision. It can cause pseudomyopia.

Cyclospasm may also exert tensions on the trabecular meshwork, opening the pores and facilitating outflow of the aqueous humour into the canal of Schlemm. The increase in aqueous humour outflow is desirable for patients with glaucoma.

== Symptoms ==
Symptoms are the same as in the case of myopia. Some of the most common symptoms are: tiredness of the eyes while looking at close objects, eye ache, headache.

== Reasons ==
The primary reason is eye fatigue as a result of excessive pressure on the eyes due to reading, watching TV, computer, poor lighting, etc. Some other reasons are poor posture, poor diet, lack of sleep, etc.

== Treatment ==
There are different ways to treat cyclospasm. Some doctors recommend special eye drops or eye exercises. Anticholinesterases may improve accommodation. Mydriatic (pupil-dilating) drugs may relieve pain caused by cyclospasm for people with corneal ulcers. There is no surgical treatment.

If cyclospasm is not treated at its early stages, it may lead to myopia.
