= Accommodative excess =

- Accommodation
- Specialty: Ophthalmology
- Symptoms: asthenopia, blurring of vision

In ophthalmology, accommodative excess (also known as excessive accommodation or accommodation excess) occurs when an individual uses more than normal accommodation (focusing on close objects) for performing certain near work. Accommodative excess has traditionally been defined as accommodation that is persistently higher than expected for the patient's age. Modern definitions simply regard it as an inability to relax accommodation readily. Excessive accommodation is seen in association with excessive convergence also.

== Symptoms and signs ==
The presentation is as follows:

- Blurring of vision due to pseudomyopia
- Headache
- Eye strain
- Asthenopia
- Trouble concentrating when reading

== Causes ==
=== Causes related to refractive errors ===
Accommodative excess may be seen in the following conditions:

- Hypermetropia: Young hypermetropes use excessive accommodation as a physiological adaptation in the interest of clear vision.
- Myopia: Young myopes performing excessive near work may also use excessive accommodation in association with excessive convergence.
- Astigmatism: Astigmatic eye may also be associated with accommodative excess.
- Presbyopia: Early presbyopic eye may also induce excessive accommodation.
- Improper or ill fitting spectacles: Use of improper or ill fitting spectacles may also cause use of excessive accommodation.

=== Causes related to systemic drugs ===
Use of systemic drugs like Morphine, Digitalis, Sulfonamides, Carbonic anhydrase inhibitors may cause accommodative excess.

=== Causes related to diseases ===
- Unilateral excessive accommodation-Trigeminal neuralgia, and head trauma may cause ciliary spasm and may cause accommodative excess.
- Bilateral excessive accommodation-Diseases like Encephalitis, Syphilis, Head trauma, Influenza, Meningitis may cause ciliary spasm and bilateral excessive accommodation.

=== Secondary to Convergence insufficiency ===
Accommodative excess may occur secondary to convergence insufficiency also. In convergence insufficiency near point of convergence will recede, and positive fusional vergence (PFV) will reduce. So, the patient uses excessive accommodation to stimulate accommodative convergence to overcome reduced PFV.

== Risk factors ==
A large amount of near work is the main precipitating factor of accommodative excess.

== Pseudomyopia ==
Pseudomyopia also known as artificial myopia refers to an intermittent and temporary shift in refractive status of the eye towards myopia. It may occur due to excessive accommodation or spasm of accommodation.

== Diagnosis ==
=== Differential diagnosis ===
Parinaud's syndrome, which can mimic some aspects of spasm of the near reflex, such as excessive accommodation and convergence; however, pupillary near-light dissociation, not miosis, is a feature of Parinaud's syndrome.

== Treatment ==
- Optical: Cycloplegic refraction, and correction of Refractive errors if any
- Vision therapy
- General: Relax from near work

== See also ==
- Spasm of accommodation
- Convergence excess
