= Eye contact (disambiguation) =

Eye contact is an event in which two people look at each other's eyes at the same time.

Eye Contact may also refer to:

- Eye-contact effect
- Contact lenses
- Eye Contact (Jay Beckenstein album)
- Eye Contact (Bob Welch album)
- Eye Contact (Gang Gang Dance album)
- "Eye Contact" (Murderbot), a 2025 television episode

== See also ==
- "Ankh Milaoongi" (lit. 'Will Make Eye Contact'), a song by Anu Malik and Asha Bhosle from the 2000 film Fiza
