= Anisocoria =

Unequal size of the eyes' pupils

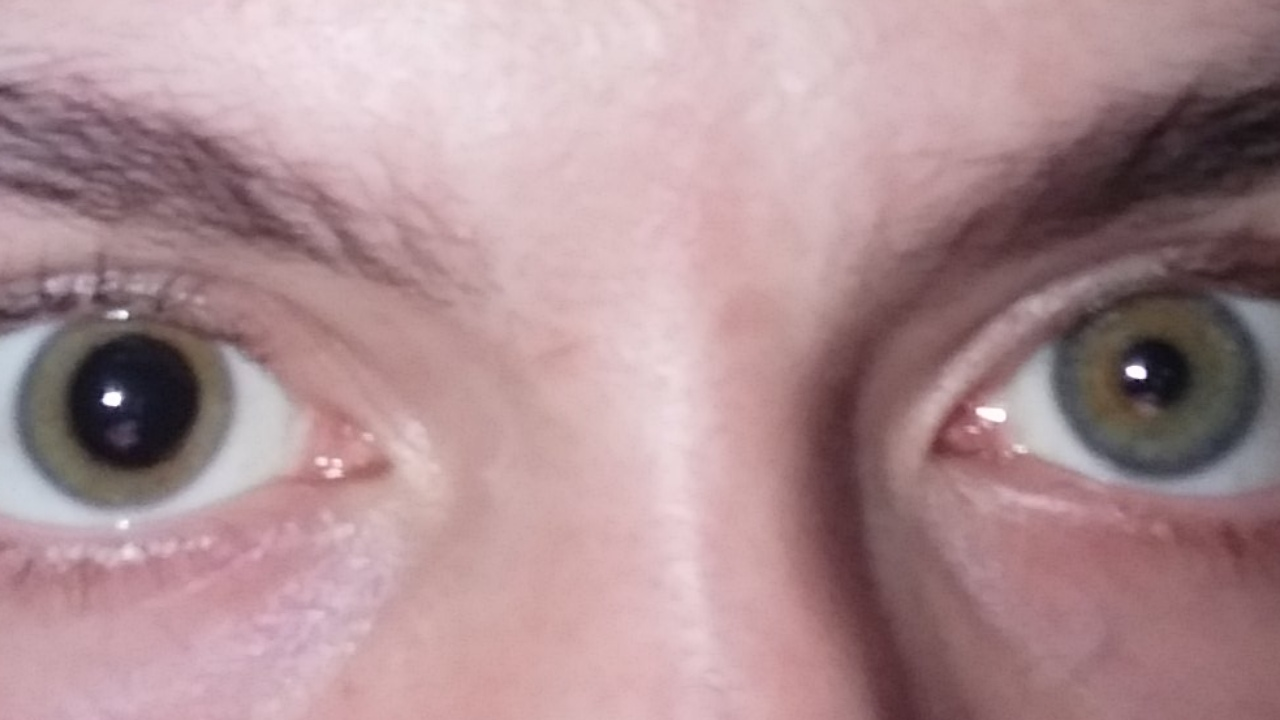
- A large difference in the size of the pupils following application of tropicamide in the right eye only
- Pronunciation: /ænˌaɪsəˈkɔːri.ə, ˌænaɪ-/
- Specialty: Ophthalmology

Anisocoria is a condition characterized by an unequal size of the eyes' pupils. Affecting up to 20% of the population, anisocoria is often entirely harmless, but can be a sign of more serious medical problems.

== Causes ==
Anisocoria is a common condition, defined by a diameter difference of 0.4 mm or more between the sizes of the pupils of the eyes.

Anisocoria has various causes:

- Physiological anisocoria: About 20% of the population has a slight difference in pupil size, which is known as physiological anisocoria. In this condition, the difference between pupils is usually less than 1 mm.
- Horner's syndrome
- Mechanical anisocoria: Occasionally, previous trauma, eye surgery, or inflammation (uveitis, angle closure glaucoma) can lead to adhesions between the iris and the lens.
- Adie tonic pupil: Tonic pupil is usually an isolated benign entity, presenting in young women. It may be associated with loss of deep tendon reflex (Adie's syndrome). Tonic pupil is characterized by delayed dilation of the iris, especially after near stimulus, segmental iris constriction, and sensitivity of pupil to a weak solution of pilocarpine.
- Oculomotor nerve palsy: Ischemia, intracranial aneurysm, demyelinating diseases (e.g., multiple sclerosis), head trauma, and brain tumors are the most common causes of oculomotor nerve palsy in adults. In ischemic lesions of the oculomotor nerve, pupillary function is usually spared, whereas in compressive lesions, the pupil is involved.
- Pharmacological agents with anticholinergic or sympathomimetic properties cause anisocoria, particularly if instilled in one eye. Some examples of pharmacological agents which may affect the pupils include pilocarpine, cocaine, tropicamide, MDMA, dextromethorphan, and ergolines. Alkaloids present in plants of the genera Brugmansia and Datura, such as scopolamine, may also induce anisocoria.
- Migraines

== Diagnosis ==
Acute-onset anisocoria should be considered a medical emergency. These cases may be due to brain mass lesions, which cause oculomotor nerve palsy. Anisocoria in the presence of confusion, decreased mental status, severe headache, or other neurological symptoms can forewarn a neurosurgical emergency. This is because a hemorrhage, tumor, or other intracranial mass can enlarge to a size where the third cranial nerve (oculomotor nerve) is compressed, resulting in uninhibited dilatation of the pupil on the same side as the lesion.

== Society and culture ==
- English singer David Bowie exhibited anisocoria, owing to a teenage injury.
- In the season 10 Big Bang Theory Comic-Con special, Steve Molaro told a story about how he first met actor Judd Hirsch and was taken aback by his dilated pupil. One of the other writers researched it and discovered that Judd Hirsch has anisocoria.
- American actress Melissa Benoist developed this condition in 2015.
- American artist Ze Frank has the condition. He was listed as second author on a paper published in The Journal of Neuroscience, which was featured briefly in episode 21 of the show named a show on May 25, 2012 called "My Pupils", explaining that his study of neuroscience of vision was motivated by his harmless anisocoria condition.

== Etymology ==
Anisocoria is composed of a prefix, root, and suffix:

- Prefix: aniso- from the Greek language (meaning unequal), which in turn comes from an: meaning not and iso meaning equal
- Root: cor, from the Greek word korē meaning pupil of the eye
- Suffix: -ia, which is a Latin suffix meaning a disease or a pathological or abnormal condition

Thus, anisocoria means the condition of unequal pupils.

== See also ==
- Cycloplegia
- Hippus
- Miosis
- Mydriasis
- Parinaud's syndrome
