= Spasm of accommodation =

Eye condition

A spasm of accommodation (also known as a ciliary spasm, an accommodation, or accommodative spasm) is a condition in which the ciliary muscle of the eye remains in a constant state of contraction. Normal accommodation allows the eye to "accommodate" for near-vision. However, in a state of perpetual contraction, the ciliary muscle cannot relax when viewing distant objects. This causes vision to blur when attempting to view objects from a distance. This may cause pseudomyopia or latent hyperopia.

Although antimuscarinic drops (homatropine 5%) can be applied topically to relax the muscle, this leaves the individual without any accommodation and, depending on refractive error, unable to see well at near distances. Also, excessive pupil dilation may occur as an unwanted side effect. This dilation may pose a problem since a larger pupil is less efficient at focusing light (see pupil, aperture, and optical aberration for more.)

Patients who have accommodative spasm may benefit from being given glasses or contacts that account for the problem or by using vision therapy techniques to regain control of the accommodative system.

Possible clinical findings include:

- Normal Amplitude of accommodation
- Normal Near point of convergence
- Reduced Negative relative accommodation
- Difficulty clearing plus on facility testing

== Treatments ==
=== Cycloplegic Eye Drops (Dilation) ===
Spasm of accommodation is frequently resistant to treatment. However, some patients do find relief through the use of daily eye dilation with cycloplegic drops. One side effect of cycloplegic drops is that they often have BAK as a preservative ingredient, which, with daily use, can erode the tear shield:

At each administration of an eye drop containing benzalkonium chloride, its detergent effect disrupts the lipid layer of the tear film. This cannot be regenerated and can no longer protect the aqueous layer of the tear film, which evaporates easily. In these circumstances, the cornea is exposed and eye dryness occurs. In addition, benzalkonium chloride has a cellular toxicity on caliciform cells, entailing a reduction in the amount of mucin, an additional reason for disrupting the tear film.

In fact, none of the cycloplegic drops used to treat Spasm of Accommodation in the United States are available without BAK. This unfortunately makes treatment much more difficult as the side effect of dry eyes and corneal damage can occur. France, Australia, Canada, and the United Kingdom do have limited availability of BAK-free eye drops available in unidose, and they must be imported to the United States with a physician's letter to the FDA enclosed with the imported prescription.

Due to the high potential of tear shield damage with long-term use and the associated dry eye condition caused by cycloplegic eye drops with BAK (preservative), many physicians do not recommend cycloplegic eye drops. In difficult cases, "cycloplegic agents are highly favored to break spasm quickly and may be more economical compared to other conventional therapies"

Cyclopentolate, Atropine, Tropicamide, and Homatropine are the typical cycloplegic eye drops used once daily to treat spasm of accommodation by relaxing the ciliary muscle. One side effect is blurred vision since these induce dilation.

=== Vision Training ===
Vision therapy administered by a trained optometrist has shown a success rate of over 70%.

=== Surgery ===
Multifocal intraocular lens implantation is a new possible treatment involving clear lens extraction and multifocal intraocular lens implantation but it may not be appropriate for patients who have had resistant spasm of accommodation for a long period of time.

== Research ==
=== Experimental Nitroglycerin and Nitric Oxide ===
Animal studies have found nitroglycerin, a vasodilator used to treat angina, relaxes the ciliary muscle and may hold hope for those suffering from spasm of accommodation. Nitroglycerin is currently being investigated as a treatment for glaucoma, and has shown to decrease intraocular pressure and relax the ciliary muscle. According to Investigative Ophthalmology & Visual Science Journal. "In a nonhuman primate study, topical administration of nitroglycerin at a dose of 0.1% significantly decreased IOP in normotensive animals after 90 minutes". Further, according to Wiederholt, Sturm, and Lepple-Wienhues, "The data indicate (indicates [sic]) that an increase of intracellular cGMP by application of cGMP and organic nitrate or non-nitrate vasodilators induces relaxation of the bovine trabecular meshwork and ciliary muscle".

=== Experimental Perilla frutescens ===
Since spasm of accommodation is a result of contraction of the ciliary muscle, the goal would be to relax the ciliary muscle. New studies conducted on rats using perilla frutescens aqueous extract have shown to relax the ciliary muscle. Since there are no known drugs to treat this eye condition, perilla frutescens in an aqueous extract form may result in the relaxation of the ciliary muscle in humans as well. Perilla frutescens is currently used in traditional medicine in Korea, Japan, and China and a clinical study "showed that PFA (perilla frutescens extract) attenuates eye fatigue by improving visual accommodation"

== Prognosis ==
For routine cases of spasm of accommodation, the American Optometric Association says the prognosis is fair and on average, the number of visits a patient needs will be 1-2 for evaluation and 10 follow up visits. Additionally, the AOA recommends the following management plan for spasm of accommodation: "Begin with plus lenses and VT; if VT fails, use cycloplegic agent temporarily; educate patient".

For more chronic and acute cases that do not respond to vision training and cycloplegic drops, the eye muscles should weaken with advancing age providing intermittent or permanent relief from this condition.

== See also ==
- Miosis
- Cycloplegia
- Pseudomyopia
