= Mechanical anisocoria =

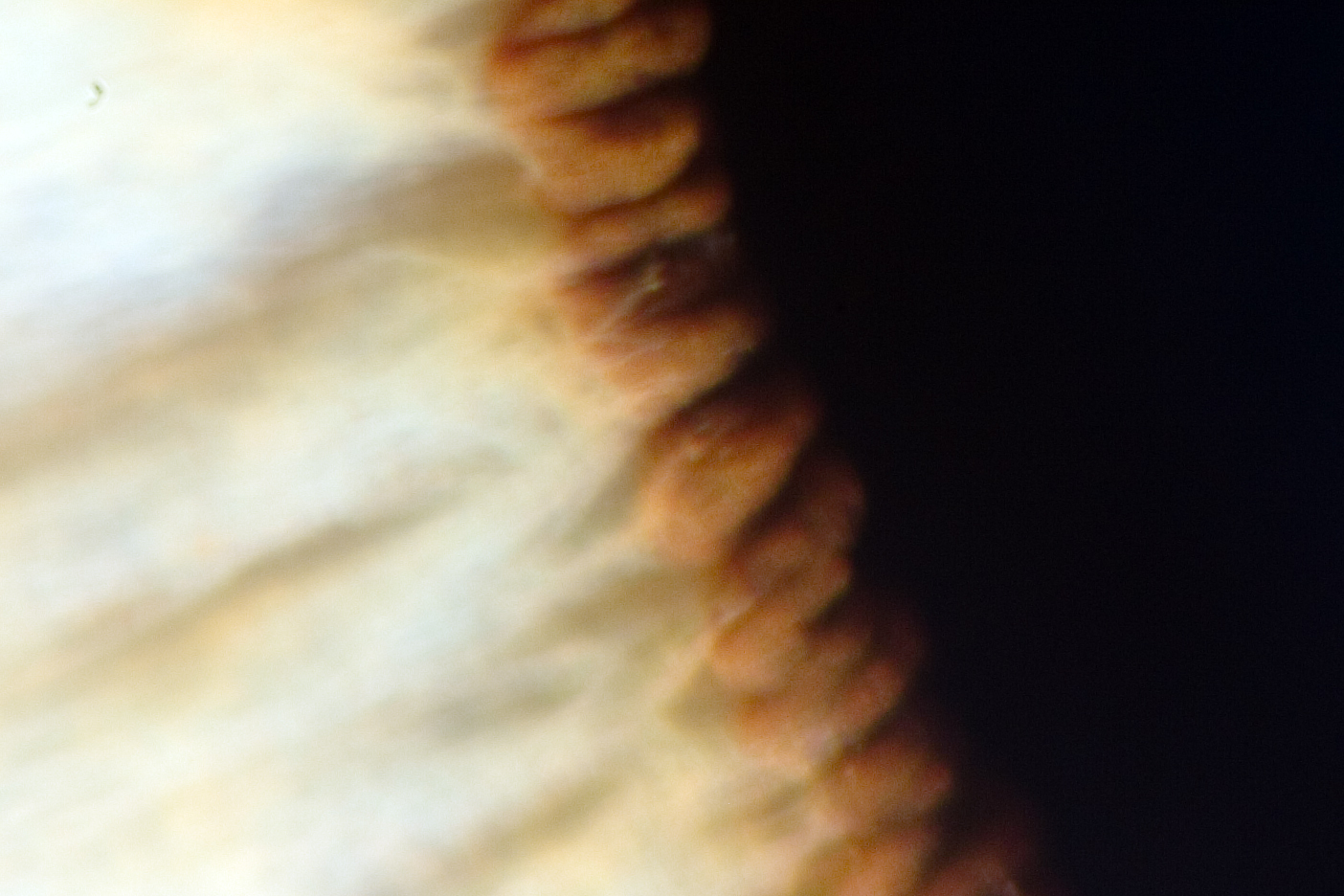
- Iris Dilator Muscle
- Specialty: Ophthalmology

Mechanical anisocoria refers to anisocoria, a common eye condition in which the two pupils differ in size, that is the result of damage to the iris dilator muscle, which may be caused by trauma, angle-closure glaucoma, surgery such as cataract removal, or uveitis (inflammation of the eye). Slit lamp examination is often used as a diagnostic aid: damage to the dilator muscle is indicated by anisocoria when light intensity is lowered.
