= Accommodative insufficiency =

- Differential diagnosis: Convergence insufficiency.

Accommodative insufficiency (AI) involves the inability of the eye to focus properly on an object. Accommodation is the adjustment of the curvature of the lens to focus on objects near and far.

In this condition, amplitude of accommodation of a person is lesser compared to physiological limits for his age. AI is generally considered separate from presbyopia, but mechanically both conditions represent a difficulty engaging the near vision system (accommodation) to see near objects clearly. Presbyopia is physiological insufficiency of accommodation due to age related changes in lens (decreased elasticity and increased hardness) and ciliary muscle power.

AI is commonly present in people with convergence insufficiency.

== Classification ==
Accommodative insufficiency is further categorised into :

=== Ill-sustained accommodation ===
Ill-sustained accommodation is a type of accommodative insufficiency in which, range of accommodation will be normal, but after excessive near work accommodative power will decrease.

=== Paralysis of accommodation ===
In paralysis of accommodation, amplitude of accommodation is either markedly reduced or completely absent (cycloplegia). It may occur due to ciliary muscle paralysis or oculomotor nerve paralysis. Parasypatholytic drugs like atropine will also cause paralysis of accommodation.

=== Unequal accommodation ===
If there is amplitude of accommodation between the eyes differ 0.5 dioptre or more, it is considered as unequal. Organic diseases, head trauma or functional amblyopia may be responsible for unequal accommodation.

== Signs and symptoms ==
Near vision will be blurred, and asthenopic symptoms like head ache and eye strain may occur while reading. Reduction of amplitude of accommodation by 2 dioptre or more is one of the important sign.

== Causes ==
Premature sclerosis of lens or ciliary muscle weaknesses due to systemic or local cases may cause accommodative insufficiency. Systemic causes of ciliary muscle weakness include diabetes, pregnancy, stress, malnutrition etc. Open angle glaucoma, Iridocyclitis etc. are known local causes.

== Treatment ==
Underlying systemic or local causes should be treated. Weak convex lenses may be prescribed for near vision until accommodation improves to normal level. Accommodation exercises may be advised to improve accommodative power.
