= Functional visual loss =

Loss of vision without any organic cause

- Specialty: Ophthalmology, Optometry, Psychology, Clinical psychology
- Symptoms: Loss of vision
- Diagnostic method: Eye examination
- Differential diagnosis: Ocular malingering, Amblyopia

Functional visual loss (FVL) also known as Functional vision loss or Nonorganic visual loss (NOVL) is a reduction in visual acuity or loss of visual field that has no physiological or organic basis. This disease can come under the spectrum of functional neurological disorder or somatic symptom disorder.

== Cause ==
In ophthalmology, Functional visual loss is the reduction in visual acuity or visual field that has no physiological or organic basis. This disease can come under the spectrum of functional neurological disorder or somatic symptom disorder under the categorization of the Diagnostic and Statistical Manual of Mental Disorders-5. But recent updates in the DSM-5 state that many patients with FVL do not have any identifiable psychological correlates.

== Diagnosis ==
Optometrists and ophthalmologists perform a number of tests to determine the cause of a person's vision loss. The types of tests vary depending on the type of vision loss the patient complains.

=== Differential diagnosis ===
Before diagnosing Functional vision loss, the patient should be tested to rule out conditions which cause defective vision or even blindness in one or both eyes with normal anterior segment and a normal fundus. Some major conditions that should be considered include:

- Amblyopia- Amblyopia is a condition in which the brain fails to fully process input from one eye and over time favors the other eye and the vision in one become reduced.
- Cortical blindness-Cortical blindness is the total or partial loss of vision in a normal-appearing eye caused by damage to the brain's occipital cortex.
- Retrobulbar neuritis- Retrobulbar neuritis cause of visual loss with normal fundus but there will be relative afferent pupillary defect (RAPD) and abnormal visually evoked responses.
- Cone dystrophy- Cone dystrophy can cause a blurring of vision, color vision defects and photophobia.
- Chiasmal tumors- In chiasmal tumors, in addition to vision loss, sluggish pupillary reactions and characteristic visual field defects may be noted.
- Ocular malingering- Type of malingering in which people simulate visual problem or blindness.

== Treatment ==
Reassurance is the best treatment that can be given for a patient who is diagnosed with functional vision loss. Ask about stress, anxiety, and depression and refer for appropriate psychiatric treatment if needed. It is important to emphasize to the patient that FVL has a good prognosis, thereby increasing the patient's hope and giving the patient a chance for recovery. Cognitive behavioral therapy or pharmaco therapy for psychiatric ailments may be needed sometimes.

== Epidemiology ==
The prevalence of Functional visual loss neuro-ophthalmology clinics is said to be 5-12%, and general ophthalmology clinics 1-5%. It is said that the total prevalence may be much more higher because patients may also consult their general practitioners, internal medicine physicians, psychiatrists or neurologists.

It is more commonly seen in children at the age group 11–20 years and is seen more commonly in females (63%) than males. Children usually complain bilateral blindness.

== Society and culture ==
The social impact of functional vision loss is largely economic. Unrecognized functional vision loss leads to fraudulent claims and undeserved benefits to the people. In case of legal blindness; Because of the financial impact and legal benefits including financial aids or reservations, optometrists and ophthalmologists are obligated to be absolutely certain that functional vision loss does not exist.
