= Homatropine =

Medication

Clinical data
- AHFS/Drugs.com: Monograph
- MedlinePlus: a601006
- ATC code: S01FA05 (WHO)

Legal status
- Legal status: In general: ℞ (Prescription only)

Identifiers
- IUPAC name: (N-Methyl-8-azabicyclo[3.2.1]oct-3-yl) 2-hydroxy-2-phenylacetate
- CAS Number: 87-00-3
- PubChem CID: 6321423
- DrugBank: DB00725
- ChemSpider: 16498795
- UNII: 8QS6WCL55Z
- ChEMBL: ChEMBL1233442
- CompTox Dashboard (EPA): DTXSID6044014
- ECHA InfoCard: 100.001.561

Chemical and physical data
- Formula: C_{16}H_{21}NO_{3}
- Molar mass: 275.348 g·mol^{−1}
- 3D model (JSmol): Interactive image
- SMILES: CN3[C@H]1CC[C@@H]3C[C@@H](C1)OC(=O)C(O)c2ccccc2
- InChI: InChI=1S/C16H21NO3/c1-17-12-7-8-13(17)10-14(9-12)20-16(19)15(18)11-5-3-2-4-6-11/h2-6,12-15,18H,7-10H2,1H3/t12-,13+,14+,15?; Key:ZTVIKZXZYLEVOL-MCOXGKPRSA-N

Homatropine (Equipin, Isopto Homatropine) is an anticholinergic medication that is an antagonist at muscarinic acetylcholine receptors and thus the parasympathetic nervous system. It is used in eye drops as a cycloplegic (to temporarily paralyze accommodation), and as a mydriatic (to dilate the pupil).

The related chemical compound homatropine methylbromide (methylhomatropine) is a different medication. Homatropine is less potent than atropine and has a shorter duration of action. It is available as the hydrobromide salt. Homatropine is also given as an atropine substitute, given to reverse the muscarinic and CNS effects associated with indirect cholinomimetic (anti-AChase) administration.

Homatropine hydrobromide is on the World Health Organization's List of Essential Medicines.

It is an antagonist of all five muscarinic acetylcholine receptors.

== Side effects ==
- Blurred vision
- Sensitivity to light

== Contraindications ==
- Untreated glaucoma
- Myasthenia gravis
- Severe heart failure
- Thyrotoxicosis
