= Hippus =

Pupillary response

Pupillary hippus, also known as pupillary athetosis, is spasmodic, rhythmic, but regular dilating and contracting pupillary movements between the sphincter and dilator muscles. Pupillary hippus comes from the Greek hippos meaning horse, perhaps due to the rhythm of the contractions representing a galloping horse. Notably, hippos in antiquity referred to involuntary eye movements which are nowadays called nystagmus.

It is particularly noticeable when pupil function is tested with a light, but is independent of eye movements or changes in illumination. It is usually normal, however pathological hippus can occur.

Pathologic hippus, the phenomenon of increased oscillation or their amplitude, is associated with aconite poisoning, altered mental status, trauma, cirrhosis, and renal disease; suggesting a common pathway of frontal lobe dysfunction. A retrospective study of 117 hospitalized patients with hippus noted an increased 30-day mortality when compared to controls and adjusted for other factors.

== See also ==
- Athetosis
- Anisocoria - condition characterized by an unequal size of the eyes' pupils.
