= D. Jackson Coleman =

American ophthalmologist

D. Jackson Coleman is a professor of clinical ophthalmology at NewYork-Presbyterian Hospital at The Edward S. Harkness Eye Institute of Columbia University. He is the former John Milton McLean Professor of Ophthalmology and chairman emeritus at Weill Cornell Medical Center where he served as chairman from 1979 to 2006. His specialties are retinal diseases and ultrasound, working with patients at Columbia University Medical Center. Coleman is also engaged in research involving ultrasound, which he has pursued throughout his career with colleague Ronald Silverman in the Department of Ophthalmology at the Columbia University Medical Center.

== Career ==
Coleman received his undergraduate degree from Union College and his medical degree from the University at Buffalo School of Medicine. Following his internship at the Columbia Medical Division at Bellevue Hospital, he served with the U.S. Public Health Service in Washington, D.C. He completed his residency in ophthalmology at the Edward S. Harkness Eye Institute of Columbia Presbyterian as a National Institutes of Health Special Fellow.

He remained on the staff at Columbia Presbyterian Medical Center until 1979, when he was appointed chairman and chief of the Ophthalmology Department at The New York Hospital and John Milton McLean Professor of Ophthalmology at Cornell University Medical College. He served as president of the medical board from 1991 to 1992, and again from 1994 to 1997. He has also served as surgical director of Manhattan Eye, Ear and Throat Hospital (MEETH), senior research physician at Riverside Research Institute in New York City and consultant at Memorial Sloan-Kettering Cancer Center. He has since returned to his roots, and is currently professor of ophthalmology at the Harkness Eye Institute of Columbia University Medical Center.

== Research ==
His interest in physics led him to develop new ultrasound technologies for examining and treating the eye. Together with William Konig and Louis Katz, he created the first commercially available B-scan ultrasound equipment. His numerous patents include those for an ultrasonically vibrated surgical knife, an ultrasonic diagnostic and therapeutic transducer assembly (with methodology), a system of therapeutic ultrasound and real-time ultrasonic scanning, and an ultrasound system for corneal biometry. His pioneering surgical techniques include the first vitreo-retinal surgery in New York and, using the ultrasound that he developed, demonstrating that operating at an earlier stage in ocular trauma could vastly improve the patient's prognosis for recovery. He has specialized in vitreo-retinal surgery and has had a career-long interest in imaging research. With a generous gift from Charles and Margaret Dyson, He established the Margaret M. Dyson Vision Research Institute, one of the major retinal research programs in the world. The Dyson Institute continues research on the causes and possible therapies for age related macular degeneration and ultrasound imaging of the retina and choroid.

== Offices and awards ==
Coleman has been an officer of every major ultrasound medical society throughout the world, including the American Institute of Ultrasound in Medicine, the Societas Internationalis de Diagnostica Ultrasonica en Ophthalmologia and the World Federation for Ultrasound in Medicine and Biology, Inc. He is past president of the American Retina Society and past president of the Club Jules Gonin of the International Retina Society. Coleman has authored over 200 peer-reviewed papers as well as numerous chapters in ophthalmology textbooks and has recently published the second edition of his textbook, Ultrasonography of the Eye and Orbit.

For his research he has received many awards including the Mildred Weisenfeld Award for Excellence in Ophthalmology from the Association for Research in Vision and Ophthalmology, the Herman Wacker Award of Club Jules Gonin, the Award of Merit in Retinal Research from the Retina Society, the Kreissig Award from the Euretina Congress, and an honorary degree from the University of Ferrara in Ferrara, Italy. Additionally, Coleman was the 2001 recipient of the Maurice R. Greenberg Distinguished Service Award, the highest honor bestowed by New York-Presbyterian Hospital/Weill Cornell Medical Center on a member of its professional staff. He has been made a Fellow of the Association for Research in Vision and Ophthalmology.

== Recent publications ==
=== Books ===
- Coleman DJ, Silverman RH, Lizzi FL, Reinstein DZ, Rondeau MJ, Lloyd HO, Daly SW. "Ultrasonography of the Eye and Orbit." 2nd Edition. Lippincott Williams & Wilkins, Philadelphia, 2006.

=== Peer reviewed ===
- Coleman, D Jackson; Silverman, Ronald H; Rondeau, Mark J; Lloyd, Harriet O; Khanifar, Aziz A; Chan, R V Paul (2013). "Age-related macular degeneration: Choroidal ischaemia?". British Journal of Ophthalmology. 97 (8): 1020–3. doi:10.1136/bjophthalmol-2013-303143. PMC 3717761. PMID 23740965.
- Kim, David Y; Silverman, Ronald H; Chan, Robison Vernon Paul; Khanifar, Aziz A; Rondeau, Mark; Lloyd, Harriet; Schlegel, Peter; Coleman, Donald Jackson (2013). "Measurement of choroidal perfusion and thickness following systemic sildenafil (Viagra®)". Acta Ophthalmologica. 91 (2): 183–8. doi:10.1111/j.1755-3768.2011.02305.x. PMC 3528845. PMID 22974308.
- Silverman, Ronald H; Ketterling, Jeffrey A; Mamou, Jonathan; Lloyd, Harriet O; Filoux, Erwan; Coleman, D Jackson (2012). "Pulse-Encoded Ultrasound Imaging of the Vitreous with an Annular Array". Ophthalmic Surgery, Lasers and Imaging. 43 (1): 82–6. doi:10.3928/15428877-20110901-03. PMC 3261320. PMID 21902166.
- Reinstein, Dan Z; Gobbe, Marine; Archer, Timothy J; Silverman, Ronald H; Coleman, D Jackson (2010). "Epithelial, Stromal, and Total Corneal Thickness in Keratoconus: Three-Dimensional Display with Artemis Very-High Frequency Digital Ultrasound". Journal of Refractive Surgery. 26 (4): 259–71. doi:10.3928/1081597X-20100218-01. PMC 3655809. PMID 20415322.
- Silverman, Ronald H; Kong, Fanting; Chen, Y.C; Lloyd, Harriet O; Kim, Hyung Ham; Cannata, Jonathan M; Shung, K. Kirk; Coleman, D. Jackson (2010). "High-Resolution Photoacoustic Imaging of Ocular Tissues". Ultrasound in Medicine & Biology. 36 (5): 733–42. doi:10.1016/j.ultrasmedbio.2010.02.006. PMC 2881573. PMID 20420969.
- Reinstein, Dan Z; Archer, Timothy J; Gobbe, Marine; Silverman, Ronald H; Coleman, D Jackson (2010). "Repeatability of Layered Corneal Pachymetry with the Artemis Very High-Frequency Digital Ultrasound Arc-Scanner". Journal of Refractive Surgery. 26 (9): 646–59. doi:10.3928/1081597X-20091105-01. PMC 4464782. PMID 19928698.
- Reinstein, Dan Z; Archer, Timothy J; Gobbe, Marine; Silverman, Ronald H; Coleman, D Jackson (2010). "Epithelial Thickness After Hyperopic LASIK: Three-Dimensional Display with Artemis Very High-Frequency Digital Ultrasound". Journal of Refractive Surgery. 26 (8): 555–64. doi:10.3928/1081597X-20091105-02. PMC 4492162. PMID 19928697.
- Reinstein, Dan Z; Archer, Timothy J; Gobbe, Marine; Silverman, Ronald H; Coleman, D Jackson (2010). "Repeatability of Layered Corneal Pachymetry with the Artemis Very High-Frequency Digital Ultrasound Arc-Scanner". Journal of Refractive Surgery. 26 (9): 646–59. doi:10.3928/1081597X-20091105-01. PMC 4464782. PMID 19928698.
- Yonekawa, Yoshihiro; Sun, Grace; Silverman, Ronald H.; Coleman, D. Jackson; Chan, R. V. Paul (April 2009). "The Role of High-Frequency Ultrasound in Ophthalmic Diagnosis". Contemporary Ophthalmology. 8 (7): 1–7. doi:10.1097/01.COP.0000347362.24136.98 (inactive 19 November 2026).
- Reinstein, D. Z; Srivannaboon, S; Gobbe, M; Archer, T. J; Silverman, R. H; Sutton, H; Coleman, D. J (2009). "Epithelial thickness profile changes induced by myopic LASIK as measured by Artemis very high-frequency digital ultrasound". Journal of Refractive Surgery. 25 (5): 444–50. doi:10.3928/1081597X-20090422-07. PMC 2695568. PMID 19507797.
- Reinstein, Dan Z; Archer, Timothy J; Gobbe, Marine; Silverman, Ronald H; Coleman, D Jackson (2009). "Stromal Thickness in the Normal Cornea: Three-Dimensional Display with Artemis Very High-Frequency Digital Ultrasound". Journal of Refractive Surgery. 25 (9): 776–86. doi:10.3928/1081597X-20090813-04. PMC 2751865. PMID 19772263.
- Mamou, Jonathan; Aristizábal, Orlando; Silverman, Ronald H; Ketterling, Jeffrey A; Turnbull, Daniel H (2009). "High-Frequency Chirp Ultrasound Imaging with an Annular Array for Ophthalmologic and Small-Animal Imaging". Ultrasound in Medicine & Biology. 35 (7): 1198–208. doi:10.1016/j.ultrasmedbio.2008.12.017. PMC 2703701. PMID 19394754.
- Silverman, Ronald H; Patel, Monica S; Gal, Omer; Sarup, Aman; Deobhakta, Avnish; Dababneh, Haitham; Reinstein, Dan Z; Feleppa, Ernest J; Coleman, D Jackson (2009). "Effect of Corneal Hydration on Ultrasound Velocity and Backscatter". Ultrasound in Medicine & Biology. 35 (5): 839–46. doi:10.1016/j.ultrasmedbio.2008.11.009. PMC 2705943. PMID 19195769.
- Reinstein, D. Z; Archer, T. J; Silverman, R. H; Rondeau, M. J; Coleman, D. J (2009). "Correlation of anterior chamber angle and ciliary sulcus diameters with white-to-white corneal diameter in high myopes using artemis VHF digital ultrasound". Journal of Refractive Surgery. 25 (2): 185–94. doi:10.3928/1081597X-20090201-03. PMC 2649749. PMID 19241769.
- Vanderbeek, Brian L; Silverman, Ronald H; Starr, Christopher E (2009). "Bilateral Salzmann-like nodular corneal degeneration after laser in situ keratomileusis imaged with anterior segment optical coherence tomography and high-frequency ultrasound biomicroscopy". Journal of Cataract & Refractive Surgery. 35 (4): 785–7. doi:10.1016/j.jcrs.2008.09.033. PMID 19304107.
- Kong, Fanting; Chen, Y. C; Lloyd, Harriet O; Silverman, Ronald H; Kim, Hyung Ham; Cannata, Jonathan M; Shung, K. Kirk (2009). "High-resolution photoacoustic imaging with focused laser and ultrasonic beams". Applied Physics Letters. 94 (3): 33902. Bibcode:2009ApPhL..94c3902K. doi:10.1063/1.3073749. PMC 2682755. PMID 19529786.
- Silverman, Ronald H; Ketterling, J. A; Mamou, J; Coleman, D. J (2008). "Improved High-Resolution Ultrasonic Imaging of the Eye". Archives of Ophthalmology. 126 (1): 94–7. doi:10.1001/archopht.126.1.94. PMC 2582753. PMID 18195224.
- Reinstein, D. Z; Archer, T. J; Gobbe, M; Silverman, R. H; Coleman, D. J (2008). "Epithelial thickness in the normal cornea: Three-dimensional display with Artemis very high-frequency digital ultrasound". Journal of Refractive Surgery. 24 (6): 571–81. doi:10.3928/1081597x-20080601-05. PMC 2592549. PMID 18581782.
- Paul, Tania; Lim, Mira; Starr, Christopher E; Lloyd, Harriet O; Coleman, D Jackson; Silverman, Ronald H (2008). "Central corneal thickness measured by the Orbscan II system, contact ultrasound pachymetry, and the Artemis 2 system". Journal of Cataract & Refractive Surgery. 34 (11): 1906–12. doi:10.1016/j.jcrs.2008.07.013. PMC 2601704. PMID 19006737.
- Hyung Kim; Cannata, J; Liu, R; Jin Chang; Silverman, R; Shung, K (2008). "20 MHz/40 MHz dual element transducers for high frequency harmonic imaging". IEEE Transactions on Ultrasonics, Ferroelectrics and Frequency Control. 55 (12): 2683–91. doi:10.1109/TUFFC.2008.983. PMC 2717901. PMID 19126492.
- Reinstein, D. Z; Archer, T. J; Gobbe, M; Silverman, R. H; Coleman, D. J (2008). "Epithelial thickness in the normal cornea: Three-dimensional display with Artemis very high-frequency digital ultrasound". Journal of Refractive Surgery. 24 (6): 571–81. doi:10.3928/1081597x-20080601-05. PMC 2592549. PMID 18581782.
- Silverman, Ronald H; Ketterling, Jeffrey A; Coleman, D Jackson (2007). "High-Frequency Ultrasonic Imaging of the Anterior Segment Using an Annular Array Transducer". Ophthalmology. 114 (4): 816–22. doi:10.1016/j.ophtha.2006.07.050. PMC 1847571. PMID 17141314.
- Silverman, Ronald H; Ketterling, Jeffrey A; Coleman, D Jackson (2007). "High-Frequency Ultrasonic Imaging of the Anterior Segment Using an Annular Array Transducer". Ophthalmology. 114 (4): 816–22. doi:10.1016/j.ophtha.2006.07.050. PMC 1847571. PMID 17141314.
- Coleman, D Jackson; Silverman, Ronald H; Rondeau, Mark J; Lloyd, Harriet O; Daly, Suzanne (2014). "Explaining the current role of high-frequency ultrasound in ophthalmic diagnosis". Expert Review of Ophthalmology. 1 (1): 63–76. doi:10.1586/17469899.1.1.63. PMC 2796804. PMID 20037660.
- Reinstein, D. Z; Sutton, H. F; Srivannaboon, S; Silverman, R. H; Archer, T. J; Coleman, D. J (2006). "Evaluating microkeratome efficacy by 3D corneal lamellar flap thickness accuracy and reproducibility using Artemis VHF digital ultrasound arc-scanning". Journal of Refractive Surgery. 22 (5): 431–40. doi:10.3928/1081-597X-20060501-03. PMID 16722480.
- Belmont, S. C; Chen, S; Ruffy, R; Chai, S. J; Silverman, R; Coleman, D. J (2006). "Very high-frequency ultrasound analysis of non-contact holmium laser thermal keratoplasty treatment spots". Journal of Refractive Surgery. 22 (4): 376–86. doi:10.3928/1081-597X-20060401-15. PMID 16629071.
- Silverman, Ronald H; Coleman, D Jackson; Ketterling, Jeffrey A; Lizzi, Frederic L (2005). "High-frequency harmonic imaging of the eye". In Walker, William F; Emelianov, Stanislav Y (eds.). Medical Imaging 2005: Ultrasonic Imaging and Signal Processing. Proceedings of SPIE. Vol. 5750. pp. 16–25. Bibcode:2005SPIE.5750...16S. doi:10.1117/12.595412. PMC 1635964. PMID 17102825.
- Lizzi, F. L; Coleman, D. J (2004). "History of ophthalmic ultrasound". Journal of Ultrasound in Medicine. 23 (10): 1255–66. doi:10.7863/jum.2004.23.10.1255. PMID 15448314. S2CID 34105599.
- Rondeau, M. J; Barcsay, G; Silverman, R. H; Reinstein, D. Z; Krishnamurthy, R; Chabi, A; Du, T; Coleman, D. J (2004). "Very high frequency ultrasound biometry of the anterior and posterior chamber diameter". Journal of Refractive Surgery. 20 (5): 454–64. doi:10.3928/1081-597X-20040901-08. PMID 15523957.
- Coleman, D; Silverman, R. H; Rondeau, M. J; Boldt, H. C; Lloyd, H. O; Lizzi, F. L; Weingeist, T. A; Chen, X; Vangveeravong, S; Folberg, R (2004). "Noninvasive in vivo detection of prognostic indicators for high-risk uveal melanoma Ultrasound parameter imaging". Ophthalmology. 111 (3): 558–64. doi:10.1016/j.ophtha.2003.06.021. PMID 15019336.
- Coleman, D.Jackson; Silverman, Ronald H; Chabi, Almira; Rondeau, Mark J; Shung, K.Kirk; Cannata, Jon; Lincoff, Harvey (2004). "High-resolution ultrasonic imaging of the posterior segment". Ophthalmology. 111 (7): 1344–51. doi:10.1016/j.ophtha.2003.10.029. PMID 15234135.
- Cannata, J.M; Ritter, T.A; Wo-Hsing Chen; Silverman, R.H; Shung, K.K (2003). "Design of efficient, broadband single-element (20-80 MHz) ultrasonic transducers for medical imaging applications". IEEE Transactions on Ultrasonics, Ferroelectrics and Frequency Control. 50 (11): 1548–57. doi:10.1109/TUFFC.2003.1251138. PMID 14682638. S2CID 2552028.
- Silverman, Ronald H; Folberg, Robert; Rondeau, Mark J; Boldt, H Culver; Lloyd, Harriet O; Chen, Xue; Lizzi, Frederic L; Weingeist, Thomas A; Coleman, D Jackson (2003). "Spectral parameter imaging for detection of prognostically significant histologic features in uveal melanoma". Ultrasound in Medicine & Biology. 29 (7): 951–9. doi:10.1016/S0301-5629(03)00907-4. PMID 12878240.
- Lincoff, Harvey; Madjarov, B; Lincoff, N; Movshovich, A; Saxena, S; Coleman, D. J; Schubert, H; Rosberger, D; McCormick, S (2003). "Pathogenesis of the Vitreous Cloud Emanating from Subretinal Hemorrhage". Archives of Ophthalmology. 121 (1): 91–6. doi:10.1001/archopht.121.1.91. PMID 12523892.
- Coleman, D.Jackson; Fish, Susan K (2001). "Presbyopia, accommodation, and the mature catenary". Ophthalmology. 108 (9): 1544–51. doi:10.1016/S0161-6420(01)00691-1. PMID 11535447.
- Silverman, R H; Lizzi, F L; Ursea, B G; Cozzarelli, L; Ketterling, J A; Deng, C X; Folberg, R; Coleman, D J (2001). "Safety levels for exposure of cornea and lens to very high-frequency ultrasound". Journal of Ultrasound in Medicine. 20 (9): 979–86. doi:10.7863/jum.2001.20.9.979. PMID 11549159. S2CID 25714772.
- Silverman, Ronald H; Reinstein, Dan Z; Lizzi, Frederick L; Coleman, D. J (2001). "Ultrasound signal processing for characterization and enhanced biometry of the cornea". In Insana, Michael F; Shung, K. Kirk (eds.). Medical Imaging 2001: Ultrasonic Imaging and Signal Processing. Proceedings of the SPIE. Vol. 4325. pp. 346–55. Bibcode:2001SPIE.4325..346S. doi:10.1117/12.428210. S2CID 136979004.
- Kruse, D; Silverman, R; Erickson, S; Coleman, D.J; Ferrara, K (2000). "Optimization of real-time high frequency ultrasound for blood flow imaging in the microcirculation". 2000 IEEE Ultrasonics Symposium. Proceedings. An International Symposium (Cat. No.00CH37121). Vol. 2. pp. 1461–92. doi:10.1109/ULTSYM.2000.921599. ISBN 978-0-7803-6365-6. S2CID 123688111.
- Silverman, R. H; Lizzi, F. L; Ursea, B. G; Rondeau, M. J; Eldeen, N. B; Kaliscz, A; Lloyd, H. O; Coleman, D. J (2001). "High-resolution ultrasonic imaging and characterization of the ciliary body". Investigative Ophthalmology & Visual Science. 42 (5): 885–94. PMID 11274063.
- Coleman, D Jackson; Silverman, Ronald H; Rondeau, Mark J (2000). "Ophthalmology". Ultrasound in Medicine & Biology. 26: S128–30. doi:10.1016/S0301-5629(00)00185-X. PMID 10794896.
- Reinstein, D. Z; Silverman, R. H; Raevsky, T; Simoni, G. J; Lloyd, H. O; Najafi, D. J; Rondeau, M. J; Coleman, D. J (2000). "Arc-scanning very high-frequency digital ultrasound for 3D pachymetric mapping of the corneal epithelium and stroma in laser in situ keratomileusis". Journal of Refractive Surgery. 16 (4): 414–30. doi:10.3928/1081-597X-20000701-04. PMID 10939721.
- Silverman, Ronald H; Lizzi, Frederick L; Kalisz, Andrew; Coleman, D. J (2000). "Three-dimensional high-resolution ultrasonic imaging of the eye". In Shung, K. Kirk; Insana, Michael F (eds.). Medical Imaging 2000: Ultrasonic Imaging and Signal Processing. Proceedings of the SPIE. Vol. 3982. pp. 36–46. Bibcode:2000SPIE.3982...36S. doi:10.1117/12.382254. S2CID 129101915.
- Deng, Cheri X; Lizzi, Frederic L; Kalisz, Andrew; Rosado, Angel; Silverman, Ronald H; Coleman, D Jackson (2000). "Study of ultrasonic contrast agents using a dual-frequency band technique". Ultrasound in Medicine & Biology. 26 (5): 819–31. doi:10.1016/S0301-5629(00)00217-9. PMID 10942829.
