= Mandelbaum effect =

Tendency for the eye to focus nearby in poor visibility

The Mandelbaum effect is the tendency for the eye to involuntarily shift its focus to a nearer distance, usually about one meter away, in conditions of poor visibility. It was first described by J. Mandelbaum in 1960. The effect occurs during conditions like darkness or fog, or through a dirty glass, where diminished visual cues lead the eyes to favor a "dark focus" or "empty-field myopia". This effect may cause pilots or drivers to miss seeing distant obstacles or hazards, and supports window cleanliness as a critical aspect of safety.

== Discussion ==
When visibility is poor, as at night during rainstorms or fog, the eye tends to relax and focus on its best distance, technically known as "empty field" or "dark focus". This distance is usually just under one meter (one yard), but varies considerably among people. The tendency is aggravated by objects close to the eye, drawing focus closer. A common synonym for the effect in FAA and Transport Canada usage is "empty-field myopia."

It has been shown that the Mandelbaum effect is not a refractive error in the usual sense: it is not a structural characteristic of the eyes, but the effect arises from normal variations of perception in the brain. As in the aviation condition known as spatial disorientation, it is posited that some people are severely affected by the effect, some mildly, and some not at all.

In aviation and automobile safety research, the Mandelbaum effect is a useful tool in determining bias in stressful conditions. There seem to be consistent patterns in pilots' and drivers' perceptions during poor visibility. Methods of compensating for the Mandelbaum effect are still subject to research.

== See also ==
- Accommodation
- Bokeh
