= Pseudomyopia =

- Specialty: Ophthalmology, Optometry
- Symptoms: Blurring of vision, eye strain

Pseudomyopia (from Greek ψεῦδο 'false' and μυωπία 'myopia') occurs when a spasm of the ciliary muscle prevents the eye from focusing in the distance, sometimes intermittently; this is different from myopia which is caused by the eye's shape or other basic anatomy. Pseudomyopia may be either organic, through stimulation of the parasympathetic nervous system, or functional in origin, through eye strain or fatigue of ocular systems. It is common in young adults who have active accommodation, and classically occurs after a change in visual requirements, such as students preparing for an exam, or a change in occupation.

== Signs and symptoms ==
The following symptoms may be seen in patients with pseudomyopia

- Blurring of distance vision: Intermittent blurring of distant vision after prolonged near work is the main symptom of pseudomyopia.
- Eye strain
- Headache
- Photophobia
- Esotropia: Acute onset esotropia may occur in accommodative spasm, which is the usual cause of pseudomyopia.
- Diplopia: Diplopia may occur due to esotropia or convergence spasm

The diagnosis is done by cycloplegic refraction using a strong cycloplegic like atropine or homatropine eye drops. Accommodative amplitude and facility may be reduced as a result of the ciliary muscle spasm.

There is a close correlation between unaided distance visual acuity and myopia; however, this correlation is not maintained in the presence of pseudomyopia, while pseudomyopia maybe presented as decrement of distance visual acuity.

== Diagnosis ==
The diagnosis of pseudomyopia is based on clinical evaluation demonstrating a discrepancy between refractive error measured under normal viewing conditions and that measured after relaxation of accommodation. Patients typically present with intermittent blurred distance vision, often following prolonged near work, while near vision remains relatively preserved.

A key diagnostic feature is the reduction or elimination of myopic refractive error following cycloplegia, achieved through the administration of cycloplegic agents (such as cyclopentolate or atropine), which temporarily paralyze the ciliary muscle. If distance vision improves and the measured refractive error decreases or resolves under cycloplegia, the condition is distinguished from true myopia.

Additional diagnostic findings may include fluctuating visual acuity, variable refraction results between examinations, and signs of accommodative spasm on dynamic retinoscopy. Ocular biometry typically reveals a normal axial length, supporting the absence of structural myopic changes.

Diagnosis requires differentiation from early or low-grade true myopia, accommodative insufficiency, and other causes of transient visual blur. Comprehensive ophthalmologic examination is recommended to exclude underlying ocular or neurologic pathology.

== Treatment ==
Treatment is dependent on the underlying aetiology. Organic causes may include systemic or ocular medications, brain stem injury, or active ocular inflammation such as uveitis. Functional pseudomyopia is managed through modification of working conditions, an updated refraction, typically involving a reduction of a myopic prescription to some lower myopic prescription, or through appropriate ocular exercises.

== See also ==
- Refraction
