= Physiological anisocoria =

Physiological anisocoria is when human pupils differ in size. It is generally considered to be benign, though it must be distinguished from congenital Horner's syndrome, pharmacological dilatation, or other conditions connected to the sympathetic nervous system. The prevalence of physiological anisocoria has not been found to be influenced by the sex, age, or iris color of the subject.

== Presentation ==
The main characteristic that distinguishes physiological anisocoria is an increase of pupil size with lower light or reduced illumination, such that the pupils differ in size between the two eyes. At any given eye examination, up to 41% of healthy patients can show an anisocoria of 0.4 mm or more at one time or another. It can also occur as the difference between both pupils varies from day to day. A normal population survey showed that during poor light or near dark conditions, differences of 1 mm on average between pupils was found. The presence of physiologic anisocoria has been estimated at 20% of the normal population, so some degree of pupil difference may be expected in at least 1 in 5 clinic patients.

== Causes ==
If detected during childhood without any other symptoms and with other disorders ruled out through clinical tests, anisocoria should be considered a developmental or genetic phenomenon. Dyscoria, a potential cause of anisocoria, refers to an abnormal shape of the pupil which may be due to developmental and intrauterine anomalies. If the abnormal eye remains dilated when shined with light, it is a pathological small pupil.
