= Ronald Silverman =

American ophthalmologist

Ronald H. Silverman is an American ophthalmologist. He is currently a Professor of Ophthalmic Science at Columbia University Medical Center. He is currently the director of the CUMC Basic Science Course in Ophthalmology, which takes place every January at the Harkness Eye Institute. He departed Weill Cornell Medical College in 2010, where he was a Professor of Ophthalmology as well as a Dyson Scholar and the Research Director of the Bioacoustic Research Facility, Margaret M. Dyson Vision Research Institute at Weill Cornell.

== Education ==
Dr. Silverman holds an M.S. in Bioengineering from the Polytechnic Institute of New York, and a Ph.D. in Computer Science from Polytechnic University. He is also a Member of the Research Staff at the Frederic L. Lizzi Center for Biomedical Engineering, Riverside Research Institute.

While working full-time at Cornell, Dr. Silverman spent his evenings studying Computer Science at Polytechnic University for a PhD. Following his interest in multivariate analysis, he became interested in the then obscure field of neural networks – simulated non-linear interconnected processing units designed to perform pattern recognition in a manner loosely connected to how the brain performs such tasks. Dr. Silverman implemented a new technique called 'back-propagation'. As part of his dissertation, he demonstrated how a multiscaled non-linear neural net could be used for automatic pattern recognition to localize tumors in ultrasound B-scans, and then to access the underlying echo data and then perform a non-linear multidimensional analysis to classify the tumor type. This work represented the first use of neural nets in medical imaging and the first use of neural nets for medical diagnosis. Dr. Silverman received his doctorate for this work in 1990.

== Career ==
=== Early high frequency ultrasound systems ===
In the early 1990s, Dr. Silverman was instrumental in the development and clinical application of one of the first very high frequency ultrasound systems. He developed a system for the acquisition of a series of parallel scan planes with a 50 MHz transducer, allowing 3-D reconstruction of the anterior segment of the eye with an axial resolution of about 30 micrometres. Working with Dan Reinstein, Dr. Silverman developed software for processing 3-D scans of the cornea that allowed measurement and mapping of corneal thickness as well as the thickness of the stroma and epithelium. They also found that they could detect and measure the flap interface in LASIK-treated eyes, and demonstrated epithelial thickening associated with regions where the stroma had been ablated. While a major achievement, the linear 3-D scan system could only obtain data in the 3 mm zone of the central cornea due to its specularity.

=== 3-D scan system ===
Silverman then developed a new 3-D scan system with 5-degrees of freedom. This system allowed the cornea to be scanned in a series of arcs such that the beam axis was maintained orthogonal to the corneal surface and the focal point maintained on the surface. This system allowed a demonstration of the importance of arc-scanning for corneal analysis and led to the subsequent development of a far simpler arc-scan device with just two programmable axes. This system led to a commercial system (Artemis-2, Ultralink, LLC), manufactured under license from Cornell University.

=== Statistics ===
He developed a multivariate statistical model based on ultrasound spectral parameters to differentiate metastatic carcinoma, and two subtypes of uveal melanoma. The publication of these findings in 1983 represented one of the first reports in the literature on medical diagnosis based on multivariate statistical analysis and one of the earliest applications of ultrasound tissue characterization.

=== Therapeutic ultrasound for glaucoma ===
Dr. Silverman was involved in the development of the use of high-intensity ultrasound for treatment of the glaucoma. This project involved the direction of an intense focused ultrasound beam at the region of the ciliary body to cause cyclodestruction. This project eventually led to a commercial device (Sonocare, Inc.) manufactured under license by Cornell, and a multicenter clinical trial. Silverman was instrumental in compiling and providing statistical analysis of treatment results from over a thousand patients treated for refractory glaucoma by this device at over 20 centers. The device became the first FDA-approved high-intensity focused ultrasound (HIFU) system. (Several commercial HIFU systems are now in clinical use, although laser techniques based on this groundbreaking effort have supplanted this technique.)

=== Eye blood flow measurement ===
Dr. Silverman, working with Katherine Ferrara, developed a new technique called swept mode for imaging of slow flow in the microvasculature. This technique was demonstrated in the iris and ciliary body and was eventually patented.

=== High-resolution imaging of eye tumors ===
Dr. Silverman described the first use of 20 MHz ultrasound to obtain improved high resolution of retinal and choroidal pathologies such as nevii and small tumors in 2004.

=== Acoustic radiation force ===
Dr. Silverman has explored the use of acoustic radiation force for characterization of ocular tissue properties. He has demonstrated measurement of force-induced displacements in the rabbit cornea during exposures of a few milliseconds, and that such displacements correlated with corneal stiffness. He also applied this technique to the retina/choroid in the rabbit and demonstrated not only force-induced displacements in these tissues and in the orbit, but also alteration in choroidal backscatter under conditions of elevated intraocular pressure where blood-flow was impeded.

== Organizational affiliations ==
Dr. Silverman is a Fellow of the American Institute for Medical and BIological Engineering. He also is a Fellow of the American Institute of Ultrasound in Medicine, past President of the American Society of Ophthalmic Ultrasound and is on the Advisory Boards of the National Institutes of Health Transducer Resource and the Ocular Oncology Research Society. He has served on numerous grant review panels, is a frequent reviewer for scientific journals and conferences, has given many invited lectures and has often served as a moderator at scientific conferences.

== External sources ==
- Official web wage at Cornell
- Official web page at Riverside Research Institute
