= Tropicamide =

Chemical compound

Clinical data
- Trade names: Mydriacyl, others
- AHFS/Drugs.com: Monograph
- License data: US DailyMed: Tropicamide
- Pregnancy category: C
- Routes of administration: Topical eye drops
- ATC code: S01FA06 (WHO)

Legal status
- Legal status: AU: S4 (Prescription only); UK: POM (Prescription only); US: ℞-only

Pharmacokinetic data
- Protein binding: 45%

Identifiers
- IUPAC name: (RS)-N-Ethyl-3-hydroxy-2-phenyl-N-(pyridin-4-ylmethyl)propanamide
- CAS Number: 1508-75-4
- PubChem CID: 5593
- IUPHAR/BPS: 7319
- DrugBank: DB00809
- ChemSpider: 5391
- UNII: N0A3Z5XTC6
- KEGG: D00397
- ChEMBL: ChEMBL1200604
- CompTox Dashboard (EPA): DTXSID8045220
- ECHA InfoCard: 100.014.673

Chemical and physical data
- Formula: C_{17}H_{20}N_{2}O_{2}
- Molar mass: 284.359 g·mol^{−1}
- 3D model (JSmol): Interactive image
- SMILES: CCN(Cc1ccncc1)C(=O)C(CO)c1ccccc1
- InChI: InChI=1S/C17H20N2O2/c1-2-19(12-14-8-10-18-11-9-14)17(21)16(13-20)15-6-4-3-5-7-15/h3-11,16,20H,2,12-13H2,1H3; Key:BGDKAVGWHJFAGW-UHFFFAOYSA-N

Tropicamide, sold under the brand name Mydriacyl among others, is a medication used to dilate the pupil and help with the examination of the eye. Specifically it is used to help examine the back of the eye. It is applied as eye drops. Effects occur within 40 minutes and last for up to a day.

Common side effects include blurry vision, increased intraocular pressure, and sensitivity to light. Another rare but severe side effect is psychosis, particularly in children. It is unclear if use during pregnancy is safe for the fetus. Tropicamide is in the antimuscarinic part of the anticholinergic family of medications. It works by making the muscles within the eye unable to respond to nerve signals.

Tropicamide was approved for medical use in the United States in 1960. It is on the World Health Organization's List of Essential Medicines.

== Medical use ==
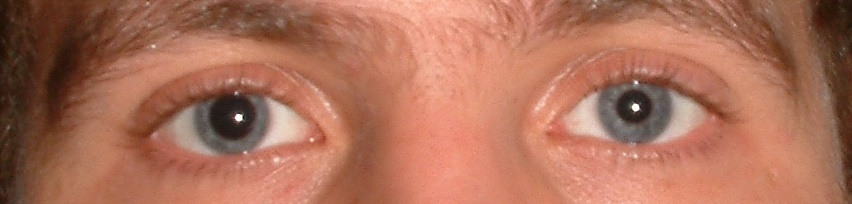
Anisocoria caused by tropicamide instilled into the subject's right eye only.

Tropicamide is an antimuscarinic drug that produces short acting mydriasis (dilation of the pupil) and cycloplegia when applied as eye drops. It is used to allow better examination of the lens, vitreous humor, and retina. Due to its relatively short duration of effect (4–8 hours), it is typically used during eye examinations such as the dilated fundus examination, but it may also be used before or after eye surgery. Cycloplegic drops are often also used to treat anterior uveitis, decreasing the risk of posterior synechiae and decreasing inflammation in the anterior chamber of the eye.

Tropicamide is occasionally administered in combination with p-hydroxyamphetamine (brand name Paremyd), which is a sympathomimetic. The use of the sympathomimetic drug causes the iris dilator muscle to be directly stimulated, causing increased dilation. In the United States, the sympathomimetic drop most commonly used along with tropicamide, is 2.5% phenylephrine hydrochloride (brand name AK-Dilate).

== Side effects ==
Tropicamide induces transient stinging and a slight and transient rise in intraocular pressure in the majority of patients. It may cause redness or conjunctivitis (inflammation) and also blurs near vision for a short while after instillation (care must be taken, and the patient must only drive when vision returns to normal). Tropicamide may, in very rare cases, cause an attack of acute angle-closure glaucoma. This tends to be in patients with narrow anterior chamber angles, and closure risk must be assessed by the practitioner prior to instillation.

Tropicamide is often preferred to atropine because atropine has a longer half-life, causing prolonged dilation and blurry vision for up to a week. Atropine has less sting effect, but can be toxic or fatal if ingested in large quantities by children or adults.

With eye drops, systemic effects are minimal to nonexistent due to very low absorption into the bloodstream.

== Pharmacology ==
=== Pharmacodynamics ===
Tropicamide is an anticholinergic. It is specifically an antimuscarinic, acting as a selective muscarinic acetylcholine M_{1} and M_{4} receptor antagonist. However, it has also been reported to be a non-selective antagonist of all five muscarinic acetylcholine receptors. As with other antimuscarinics, tropicamide can produce deliriant effects.

== Recreational use ==
Tropicamide is sometimes abused (injected intravenously e.g. by insulin syringe) as an inexpensive recreational deliriant drug (along with naphazoline). This was initially reported in Russia, but has subsequently spread to various other countries in the former Soviet Union and around Europe, and later in the United States.

Tropicamide severely destroys internal organs when injected.

== Stereochemistry ==
Tropicamide has a chiral center and two enantiomers. Medications are racemates.

Enantiomers
(R)-Tropicamid; CAS: 92934-63-9	(S)-Tropicamid; CAS: 92934-64-0
