= Eye contact effect =

Psychological phenomenon

The eye-contact effect is a psychological phenomenon in human selective attention and cognition. It is the effect that the perception of eye contact with another human face has on certain mechanisms in the brain. This contact has been shown to increase activation in certain areas of what has been termed the ‘social brain’. This social brain network processes social information as the face, theory of mind, empathy, and goal-directedness.

== Activation in the brain ==
When gaze is direct, the eye-contact effect produces activation in the social brain. These six regions demonstrate that perceived eye contact increases activation of elements within this network, with the area of activation depending on task demands and the social context.

=== Fusiform gyrus ===
Increase in regional cerebral blood flow (rCBF) shows larger activation for direct than averted gaze in this area. It has been suggested that this increased activation is related to initial increased face encoding. However, these effects are absent when one has already been presented with a face and its gaze shifts towards the participant. This indicates that when attending to face identity, face encoding effects can be masked.

=== Anterior, right side of superior temporal sulcus ===
When directing gaze specifically towards the eye area, the anterior, right side of the superior temporal sulcus is activated, indicating facilitation of gaze direction encoding in this region when eye contact is present. Like the fusiform gyrus, this effect can also be masked in this area.

=== Posterior, right side of superior temporal sulcus ===
The activation in this region of the brain during the eye contact effect is not always consistent. Although it has been demonstrated in several studies when dynamic stimuli are used, activation is not demonstrated across all literatures. The studies that demonstrate activation provided social or communicative context in their experiments, suggesting that the eye-contact effect only activates the posterior right side of superior temporal sulcus in these instances.

=== Medial prefrontal cortex and orbitofrontal cortex ===
These two areas activate when dynamic facial expressions are presented as well as in a communication context when participants are required to decode the intention of the presented face. Like the posterior right side of superior temporal sulcus, this suggests that context could be a factor in this activation. However, some studies have shown higher activation in the medial prefrontal cortex when averted gaze is perceived than direct gaze. This activation was in a slightly posterior position compared to the areas which had higher activation for direct gaze.

=== Amygdala ===
The activation in the amygdala, like the posterior right side of superior temporal sulcus, is not hugely consistent either. While three studies have found activation for direct gaze in this area, several studies have found no effect. It is speculated that due to the small size of the amygdala, neural imaging methods are not sensitive enough to correctly detect activation.

== Underlying mechanisms ==
Three models have been developed to explain the mechanisms underlying the eye-contact effect. These models show the areas of the brain that are activated by direct eye contact and where they overlap in activation with areas in the brain related to the social brain network.

=== The affective arousal model ===
This model proposes that eye contact directly activates brain arousal systems and emotional responses which influences perceptual and cognitive processing. Because reciprocated eye contact elevates emotional arousal, activation becomes widespread across cortical structures as emotional arousal is often associated with the amygdala. As gaze is directed towards the perceiver, activation increases in a region in the right amygdala. However, this model fails to account for the selective nature of activation effects. Activation must be more widespread across the network if general arousal is the main effect at work.

=== The communicative intention detector model ===
Eye contact signals intent of communication and the social significance of eye gaze engages theory of mind computations. Because there is an overlap of activation in structures involved in theory of mind computation with regions associated with eye contact detection, this model proposes that this is the mechanism that causes the eye contact effect. However, only parts of the theory of mind network (medial prefrontal cortex, posterior right side of superior temporal sulcus, and sometimes precuneus and amygdala) are activated depending on task demands and context.

=== The first-track modulator model ===
Proposed by Senju and Johnson, this model argues that the eye contact effect is facilitated by the subcortical face detection pathway. This pathway involves the superior colliculus, pulvinar, and amygdala. This route is fast and operates on low spatial frequency and modulates cortical face processing.

== Development ==
Sensitivity to eye contact is present in newborns. From as early as four months old cortical activation as a result of eye contact has suggested that infants are able to detect and orient towards faces that make eye contact with them. This sensitivity to eye contact remains as the presence of eye contact has an effect on the processing of social stimuli in slightly older infants. For example, a 9-month-old infant will shift its gaze towards an object in response to another face shifting its gaze towards the same object.

As humans get older, the eye contact effect develops as well. Accurate face recognition facilitated by direct gaze improves over the period of development from 6 to 11 years of age.

== Atypical development ==
=== Autistic spectrum disorders ===
Autistic spectrum disorders (ASDs), which include autism and Asperger syndrome, are characterized by difficulties with social interaction and communication. Atypical responses to direct gaze, a characteristic of ASD, have been demonstrated to manifest in infancy, suggesting that these responses are present from early in development.

Due to these difficulties, the development of the eye contact effect may be obstructed. However, studies addressing eye contact in individuals with ASD can elicit mixed results. Response to eye contact has been identified as stronger neuro-physiologically for direct gaze than indirect gaze. This may be due to individuals with ASD responding faster to eye contact based on their detection of features, rather than in the facial context.

== See also ==
- Stare-in-the-crowd effect
