= Convergence insufficiency =

Reduced ability of the eyes to turn inward when focusing

Convergence Insufficiency
- Other names: Convergence disorder
- Specialty: Ophthalmology, optometry

Convergence insufficiency is a sensory and neuromuscular anomaly of the binocular vision system, characterized by a reduced ability of the eyes to turn towards each other, or sustain convergence.

== Symptoms and signs ==
The symptoms and signs associated with convergence insufficiency are related to prolonged, visually demanding, near-centered tasks. They may include, but are not limited to, diplopia (double vision), asthenopia (eye strain), transient blurred vision, difficulty sustaining near-visual function, abnormal fatigue, headache, and abnormal postural adaptation, among others. In some cases, difficulty with making eye contact have been noted as a complaint amongst those affected. Note that some Internet resources confuse convergence and divergence dysfunction, reversing them.

=== Complications ===
In some cases, convergence insufficiency can be the underlying cause of difficulty learning to read. As a result of the eyes not converging on the same point for sustained periods of time when reading, words can appear blurry or double because the brain is receiving two different images. Convergence insufficiency is not a learning disability. However, some children with the condition who are struggling to learn to read can be confused for having dyslexia due to difficulty learning to read. Children struggling with symptoms such as letters appearing blurry or double and experience tiredness or headaches when reading should consult an optometrist.

== Diagnosis ==
Diagnosis of convergence insufficiency is made by an eye care professional skilled in binocular vision dysfunctions, such as an optometrist, ophthalmologist, or orthoptist to rule out any organic disease. Convergence insufficiency is characterized by one or more of the following diagnostic findings: patient symptoms, high exophoria at near, reduced accommodative convergence/accommodation ratio, receded near point of convergence, and low fusional vergence ranges and/or facility. Some patients with convergence insufficiency have concurrent accommodative insufficiency—accommodative amplitudes should therefore also be measured in symptomatic patients.

Convergence insufficiency can cause difficulty learning to read.

== Treatment ==
Convergence insufficiency may be treated with convergence exercises prescribed by an eyecare specialist trained in orthoptics or binocular vision anomalies (see: vision therapy). Some cases of convergence insufficiency are successfully managed by prescription of eyeglasses, sometimes with therapeutic prisms.

Pencil push-ups therapy is performed at home. The patient brings a pencil slowly to within 2–3 cm (0.79–1.18 in) of the eye just above the nose about fifteen minutes per day five times per week. Patients should record the closest distance that they could maintain fusion (keep the pencil from going double as long as possible) after each five minutes of therapy. Computer software may be used at home or in an orthoptist's/vision therapist's office to treat convergence insufficiency. A weekly 60-minute in-office therapy visit may be prescribed. This is generally accompanied with additional in-home therapy.

In 2005, the Convergence Insufficiency Treatment Trial (CITT) published two randomized clinical studies. The first, published in Archives of Ophthalmology, demonstrated that computer exercises when combined with office/based vision therapy/orthoptics were more effective than "pencil pushups" or computer exercises alone for convergency insufficiency in nine- to eighteen-year-old children. The second found similar results for adults 19 to 30 years of age. In a bibliographic review of 2010, the CITT confirmed their view that office-based accommodative/vergence therapy is the most effective treatment of convergence insufficiency, and that substituting it in entirety or in part with other eye training approaches such as home-based therapy may offer advantages in cost but not in outcome. A later study of 2012 confirmed that orthoptic exercises led to longstanding improvements of the asthenopic symptoms of convergence sufficiency both in adults and in children. A 2020 Cochrane Review concludes that office-based vergence/accommodative therapy with home reinforcement is more effective than home-based pencil/target push-ups or home-based computer vergence/accommodative therapy for children. In adults, evidence of the effectiveness of various non-surgical interventions is less clear.

Technical development has led to the introduction of virtual reality (VR)-based training for convergence insufficiency (CI). A systematic review published in 2025 aimed to conclude if VR-based training in CI is effective. Due to the small number of relevant published studies (n=3) the authors could not draw any clear conclusions.

Both positive fusional vergence (PFV) and negative fusional vergence (NFV) can be trained, and vergence training should normally include both. Surgical correction options are also available, but the decision to proceed with surgery should be made with caution as convergence insufficiency generally does not improve with surgery. Bilateral medial rectus resection is the preferred type of surgery. However, the patient should be warned about the possibility of uncrossed diplopia at distance fixation after surgery. This typically resolves within one to three months postoperatively. The exophoria at near often recurs after several years, although most patients remain asymptomatic.

== Prevalence ==
Among fifth and sixth grade children convergence insufficiency is 13%. In studies that used standardized definitions of convergence insufficiency, investigators have reported a prevalence of 4.2–6% in school and clinic settings. The standard definition of convergence insufficiency is exophoria greater at near than at distance, a receded near point of convergence, and reduced convergence amplitudes at near.

Convergence insufficiency (CI) and other visual dysfunctions are known to occur as a consequence of traumatic brain injury (TBI). It has been reported that up to 79% of TBI patients report visual symptoms likely to relate to CI.

== See also ==
- Amblyopia
- Brock string
- Negative relative accommodation
- Ophthalmology
- Optometry
- Orthoptics
- Positive relative accommodation
- Strabismus
- Vision therapy
