= Negative relative accommodation =

Vision metric

Negative relative accommodation (NRA) was proposed by Joseph Kearney of Oxford University in 1967 as a measure of the maximum ability to relax accommodation while maintaining clear, single binocular vision. It is an indirect measurement of fusional vergence in binocular vision.

This measurement is typically obtained by an orthoptist, ophthalmologist or optometrist during an eye examination using a phoropter. After the patient's distance correction is established, the patient is instructed to view small letters on a card 40 cm from the eyes. The examiner adds convex lenses in +0.25 increments until the patient first reports that they become blurry. The total value of the lenses added to reach this point is the NRA value. High NRA values (above +2.50) might be evidence to over minus, uncorrected hyperopia or latent hyperopia.

== See also ==
- Amplitude of accommodation
- Convergence insufficiency
- Positive relative accommodation
