= Cycloplegia =

Inability to focus the eye due to ciliary muscle paralysis

- Other names: Ciliary muscle paresis, Paralysis of accommodation
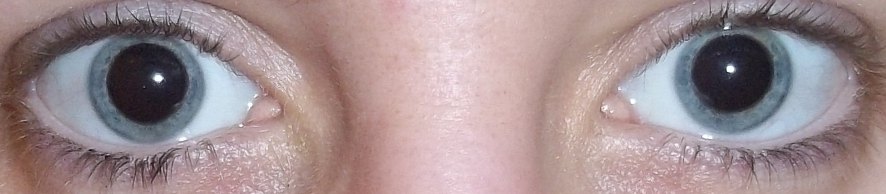
- Dilated pupil (mydriasis) caused by cyclopentolate instilled into both eyes
- Specialty: Ophthalmology

Cycloplegia is paralysis of the ciliary muscle of the eye, resulting in a loss of accommodation. Because of the paralysis of the ciliary muscle, the curvature of the lens can no longer be adjusted to focus on nearby objects. This results in similar problems as those caused by presbyopia, in which the lens has lost elasticity and can also no longer focus on close-by objects. Cycloplegia with accompanying mydriasis (dilation of pupil) is usually due to topical application of muscarinic antagonists such as atropine and cyclopentolate.

Belladonna alkaloids are used for testing the error of refraction and examination of eye.

== Management ==
Cycloplegic drugs are generally muscarinic receptor antagonists such as atropine, cyclopentolate, homatropine, scopolamine and tropicamide. They are indicated for use in cycloplegic refraction (to paralyze the ciliary muscle in order to determine the true refractive error of the eye) and the treatment of uveitis. All cycloplegics are also mydriatic (pupil dilating) agents and are used as such during eye examination to better visualize the retina.

When cycloplegic drugs are used as a mydriatic to dilate the pupil, the pupil in the normal eye regains its function when the drugs are metabolized or carried away. Some cycloplegic drugs can cause dilation of the pupil for several days. The ones specifically used by ophthalmologists or optometrists wear off in hours, but when the patient leaves the office strong sunglasses are provided for comfort.

== See also ==
- Adie syndrome
- Anisocoria
- Marcus Gunn pupil
- Miosis
- Parinaud's syndrome
- Syphilis
