= Panuveitis =

Disorder of the human eye

- Other names: Diffuse uveitis, Total uveitis
- Specialty: Ophthalmology
- Complications: Permanent vision loss
- Diagnostic method: Eye examination

Panuveitis also known as Diffuse uveitis or Total uveitis is an eye disease affecting the internal structures of the eye. This inflammation occurs throughout the uveal tract, with no specific areas of predominant inflammation. In most cases, along with the uvea, the retina, vitreous humor, optic nerve or lens are also involved.

== Signs and symptoms ==
Symptoms of panuveitis include eye pain, redness, sensitivity to light, discharge, blurring of vision, flashes and floaters. There will be signs of inflammations of all the uveal parts.

== Causes ==
In many cases the cause of panuveitis is unknown. Possible causes include exogenous or endogenous infection, injury, or an autoimmune disease. Endogenous infections caused by syphilis, tuberculosis, mumps, smallpox, influenza, toxoplasmosis, lupus, sarcoidosis, and immune-related inflammations such as Behcet syndrome or Vogt–Koyanagi–Harada disease causes panuveitis.

Infections from a perforating wound or ulcer in the eye, secondary infections from other ocular tissues, or a surgical trauma from intraocular procedures such as cataract surgery, glaucoma surgery or vitreoretinal surgery can also cause panuveitis.

== Diagnosis ==
Diagnosis of panuveitis is based on the clinical signs of inflammations of all the uveal parts. There will be evidence of anterior uveitis (iris, Cyclitis and iridocyclitis) and choroiditis. Slit lamp examination may reveal vitreous cells, aqueous cells and flare and keratic precipitates.

=== Definition ===
Panuveitis is a type of uveitis in which inflammation occurs throughout the uveal tract, with no specific areas of predominant inflammation. In most cases, along with the uvea, the retina, vitreous humor, optic nerve or lens are involved.

International Uveitis Study Group (IUSG) defines panuveitis as generalized inflammation of all three parts (iris, ciliary body and choroid) of the uvea.

== Treatment ==
If there is an underlying cause, treatment should be given based on the disease. Non specific treatment measures include cycloplegics, corticosteroids and immunosuppressive drugs. The biologic drugs that are currently used in treatment of panuveitis include anti tumor necrosis factor, cytokine receptor antibodies and interferon-α.
