= Circulus arteriosus =

Circulus arteriosus may refer to

- Circulus arteriosus major, an anastomosis of the anterior ciliary arteries
- Circulus arteriosus minor, an arterial circle near the pupillary margin of the iris
- Circle of Willis, also known as circulus arteriosus cerebri
