= Ciliary arteries =

Branches of a major artery in the eye

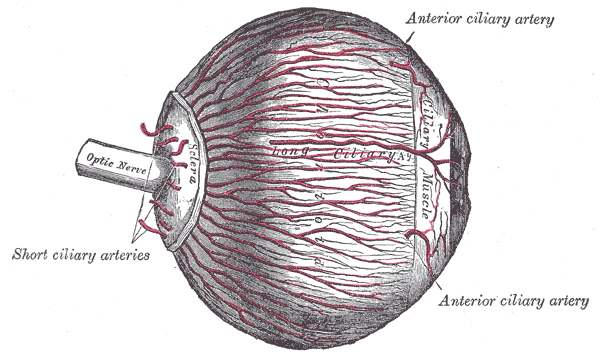
- The arteries of the choroid and iris. The greater part of the sclera has been removed.

Details

Identifiers
- Latin: arteriae ciliares
- MeSH: D019842

The ciliary arteries are divisible into three groups, the long posterior, short posterior, and the anterior.

- The short posterior ciliary arteries from six to twelve in number, arise from the ophthalmic artery as it crosses the optic nerve.
- The long posterior ciliary arteries, two for each eye, pierce the posterior part of the sclera at some little distance from the optic nerve.
- The anterior ciliary arteries are derived from the muscular branches of the ophthalmic artery.

== Additional images ==
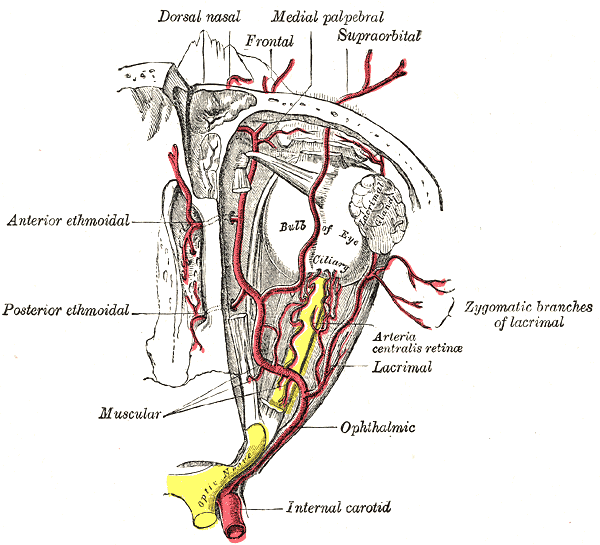
The ophthalmic artery and its branches

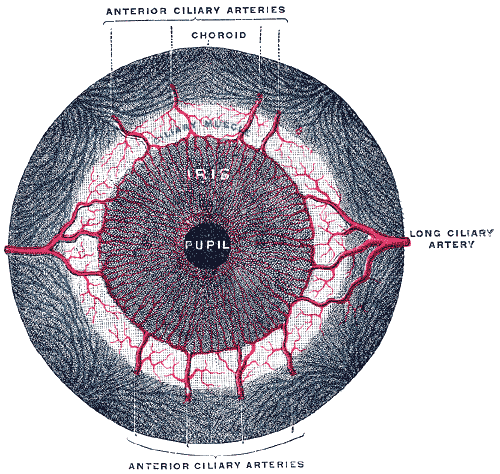
Iris, front view.

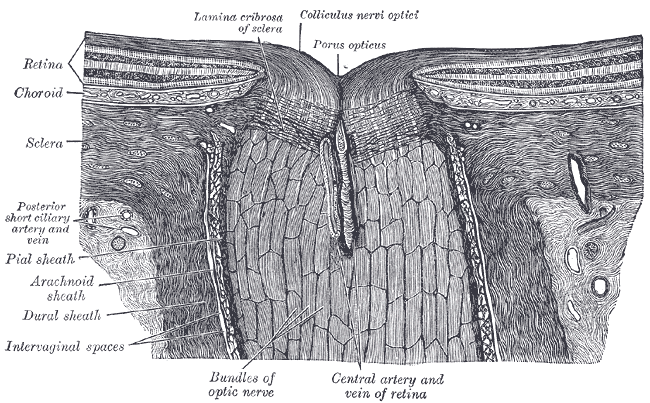
The terminal portion of the optic nerve and its entrance into the eyeball, in horizontal section.
