= Posterior ciliary arteries =

Posterior ciliary arteries may refer to:

- Long posterior ciliary arteries
- Short posterior ciliary arteries
