= List of adverse effects of ribavirin =

List of adverse effects of ribavirin by frequency.

== Very common (>10% frequency) ==
- Abdominal pain
- Anemia
- Anxiety
- Appetite loss
- Concentration impaired
- Depression
- Diarrhea
- Dizziness
- Dry mouth
- Dry skin
- Emotional lability
- Fatigue
- Fever
- Hair loss
- Headache
- Influenza-like illness
- Insomnia
- Irritability
- Itchiness
- Joint aches and pains
- Muscle aches and pains
- Muscle weakness
- Musculoskeletal pain
- Nausea
- Neutropenia
- Rash
- Rigors
- Shortness of breath
- Viral pharyngitis
- Vomiting
- Weight loss

== Common (1-10% frequency) ==
- Arthritis
- Back pain
- Cardiac murmur
- Chest discomfort
- Chest pain
- Dehydration
- Feeling abnormal
- Flushing
- Hemolytic anemia
- Hepatomegaly
- Hyperbilirubinemia
- Hyperglycemia
- Hypertension
- Hyperthyroidism
- Hyperuricemia
- Hypocalcemia
- Hypotension
- Hypothyroidism
- Increased appetite
- Jaundice
- Leukopenia
- Lymphadenopathy
- Lymphopenia
- Malaise
- Micturition frequency
- Muscle spasms
- Neoplasm formation
- Pain in extremity
- Palpitation
- Peripheral edema
- Polyuria
- Tachycardia
- Thirst
- Thrombocytopenia
- Urine abnormality

- Gastrointestinal disturbances (including mouth ulcers, indigestion, diarrhea, constipation, etc.)
- Infections (including sinusitis, the flu, sepsis, UTIs, etc.)
- Neurologic disturbances (including memory loss, migraines, incoordination, sensory distortions, etc.)
- Psychiatric disturbances (including suicidal ideation and psychosis)
- Sexual disturbances (including erectile dysfunction, prostatis, amenorrhea, etc.)
- Skin disturbances (including acne, eczema, psoriasis, etc.)
- Upper respiratory tract disturbances (including nosebleeds, nasal/sinus congestion, etc.)
- Visual and hearing disturbances (including tinnitus, blurred vision, etc.)

== Uncommon (0.1-1% frequency) ==
- Bone pain
- Diabetes mellitus
- Facial edema
- Heart attack
- Hypersensitivity
- Hypertriglyceridemia
- Immediately life-threatening psychiatric disturbances, including suicide attempts and hallucinations
- Mouth pain
- Neuropathy
- Pancreatitis

== Rare (0.01-0.1% frequency) ==
- Arrhythmia
- Bipolar episode
- Cardiomyopathy
- Ischemic colitis
- Kidney failure or insufficiency
- Myositis
- Pneumonia
- Rhabdomyolysis
- Rheumatoid arthritis
- Sarcoidosis
- Seizures
- Serious eye complications
- Vasculitis

== Very rare (<0.01% frequency) ==
- Aplastic anemia
- Cardiac ischemia
- Encephalopathy
- Erythema multiforme
- Life-threatening lung complications
- Liver failure
- Nephrotic syndrome
- Polyneuropathy
- Stevens–Johnson syndrome
- Stroke
- Suicide
- Toxic epidermal necrolysis
- Ulcerative colitis

== Unknown frequency ==
- Anaphylaxis
- Angioedema
- Bronchoconstriction
- Facial palsy
- Hives
- Homicidal ideation
- Idiopathic thrombocytopenic purpura
- Mania
- Mental status change
- Mononeuropathies
- Pericardial effusion
- Pericarditis
- Periodontal disease
- Pure red cell aplasia
- Systemic lupus erythematosus
- Thrombotic thrombocytopenic purpura
- Vasculitis
- Vogt–Koyanagi–Harada disease
