= Circulus arteriosus minor =

Arterial circle near the pupillary margin of the iris

Minor circulus arteriosus of iris

Details
- Location: Human eye

Identifiers
- Latin: circulus arteriosus iridis minor
- TA98: A15.2.03.035
- TA2: 4483
- FMA: 58581

Circulus arteriosus minor or minor arterial circle of iris is an arterial circle near the pupillary margin of the iris. It is formed by branches from the major arterial circle of the iris.
