= Vogt–Koyanagi–Harada disease =

- Other names: Vogt–Koyanagi–Harada syndrome, uveomeningitis syndrome, uveomeningoencephalitic syndrome
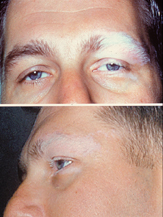
- Dermatologic manifestation of VKH
- Specialty: Ophthalmology

Vogt–Koyanagi–Harada disease (VKH) is a multisystem disease of presumed autoimmune cause that affects melanin-pigmented tissues. The most significant manifestation is bilateral, diffuse uveitis, which affects the eyes. VKH may variably also involve the inner ear, with effects on hearing, the skin, and the meninges of the central nervous system.

== Signs and symptoms ==
=== Overview ===
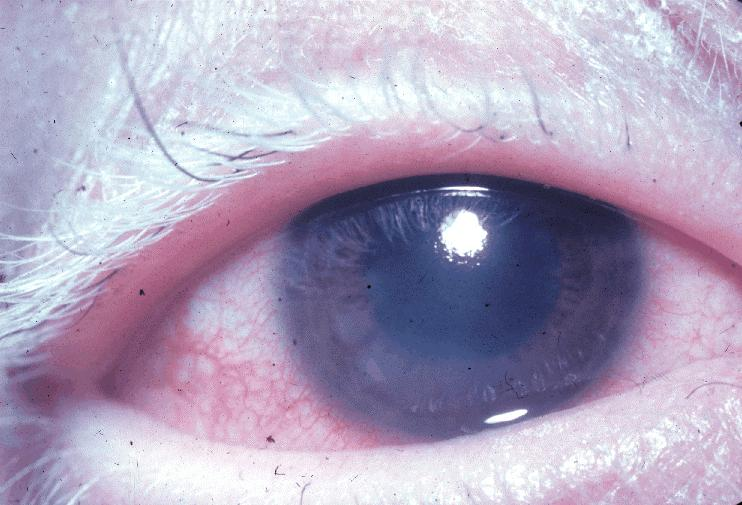
Uveitis with poliosis of the eyelashes

The disease is characterised by bilateral diffuse uveitis, with pain, redness and blurring of vision. The eye symptoms may be accompanied by a varying constellation of systemic symptoms, such as auditory (tinnitus, vertigo, and hypoacusis), neurological (meningismus, with malaise, fever, headache, nausea, abdominal pain, stiffness of the neck and back, or a combination of these factors; meningitis, CSF pleocytosis, cranial nerve palsies, hemiparesis, transverse myelitis and ciliary ganglionitis), and cutaneous manifestations, including poliosis, vitiligo, and alopecia. The vitiligo often is found at the sacral region.

=== Phases ===
The sequence of clinical events in VKH is divided into four phases - prodromal, acute uveitic, convalescent, and chronic recurrent.

The prodromal phase may have no symptoms, or may mimic a nonspecific viral infection, marked by flu-like symptoms that typically last for a few days. Fever, headache, nausea, meningismus, dysacusia (discomfort caused by loud noises or a distortion in the quality of the sounds being heard), tinnitus, and/or vertigo may occur. Eye symptoms can include orbital pain, photophobia, and tearing. The skin and hair may be sensitive to touch. Cranial nerve palsies and optic neuritis are uncommon.

The acute uveitic phase occurs a few days later and typically lasts for several weeks. This phase is heralded by bilateral panuveitis causing blurring of vision. In 70% of VKH cases, the onset of visual blurring is bilaterally contemporaneous; if initially unilateral, the other eye is involved within several days. The process can include bilateral granulomatous anterior uveitis, variable degree of vitritis, thickening of the posterior choroid with elevation of the peripapillary retinal choroidal layer, optic nerve hyperemia and papillitis, and multiple exudative bullous serous retinal detachments.

The convalescent phase is characterized by gradual tissue depigmentation of skin with vitiligo and poliosis, sometimes with nummular depigmented scars, as well as alopecia and diffuse fundus depigmentation resulting in a classic orange-red discoloration ("sunset glow fundus") and retinal pigment epithelium clumping and/or migration.

The chronic recurrent phase may be marked by repeated bouts of uveitis, but is more commonly a chronic, low-grade, often subclinical, uveitis that may lead to granulomatous anterior inflammation, cataracts, glaucoma, and ocular hypertension. Full-blown recurrences, though, are rare after the acute stage is over. Dysacusia may occur in this phase.

== Cause ==
Although sometimes a viral infection, or skin or eye trauma precedes an outbreak, the exact underlying initiator of VKH disease remains unknown. VKH is attributed, however, to aberrant T-cell-mediated immune response directed against self-antigens found on melanocytes. Stimulated by interleukin 23 (IL-23), T helper 17 cells and cytokines, such as interleukin 17, appear to target proteins in the melanocytes.

== Risk factors ==
Affected individuals are typically 20 to 50 years old. The female-to-male ratio is 2:1. By definition, affected people have no history of either surgical or accidental ocular trauma. VKH is more common in Asians, Latinos, Middle Easterners, American Indians, and Mexican Mestizos; it is much less common in Caucasians and in Blacks from sub-Saharan Africa.

VKH is associated with a variety of genetic polymorphisms that relate to immune function. For example, it has been associated with human leukocyte antigens (HLA) HLA-DR4 and DRB1/DQA1, copy-number variations of complement component 4, a variant IL-23R locus and with various other non-HLA genes. HLA-DRB1*0405 in particular appears to play an important susceptibility role.

== Diagnosis ==
If tested in the prodromal phase, cerebrospinal fluid pleocytosis is found in more than 80% of cases, with mainly lymphocytes. This pleocytosis resolves in about 8 weeks even if chronic uveitis persists.

Functional tests may include electroretinogram and visual field testing. Diagnostic confirmation and an estimation of disease severity may involve imaging tests such as retinography, fluorescein or indocyanine green angiography, optical coherence tomography and ultrasound. For example, indocyanine green angiography may detect continuing choroidal inflammation in the eyes without clinical symptoms or signs. Ocular MRI may be helpful and auditory symptoms should undergo audiologic testing. Histopathology findings from eye and skin are discussed by Walton.

The diagnosis of VKH is based on the clinical presentation; the diagnostic differential is extensive, and includes sympathetic ophthalmia, sarcoidosis, primary intraocular B-cell lymphoma, posterior scleritis, uveal effusion syndrome, tuberculosis, syphilis, and multifocal choroidopathy syndromes.

=== Types ===
Based on the presence of extraocular findings, such as neurological, auditory, and integumentary manifestations, the "revised diagnostic criteria" of 2001 classify the disease as complete (eyes along with both neurological and skin), incomplete (eyes along with either neurological or skin), or probable (eyes without either neurological or skin) . By definition, for research homogeneity purposes, the two exclusion criteria are previous ocular penetrating trauma or surgery, and other concomitant ocular disease similar to VKH disease.

== Management ==
The acute uveitis phase of VKH is usually responsive to high-dose oral corticosteroids; parenteral administration is usually not required. However, ocular complications may require a subtenon or intravitreous injection of corticosteroids or bevacizumab. In refractory situations, other immunosuppressives such as cyclosporine, or tacrolimus, antimetabolites (azathioprine, mycophenolate mofetil or methotrexate), or biological agents such as intravenous immunoglobulins (IVIG) or infliximab may be needed.

== Outcomes ==
Visual prognosis is generally good with prompt diagnosis and aggressive immunomodulatory treatment. Inner ear symptoms usually respond to corticosteroid therapy within weeks to months; hearing usually recovers completely. Chronic eye effects such as cataracts, glaucoma, and optic atrophy can occur. Skin changes usually persist despite therapy.

== Eponym ==
VKH syndrome is named for ophthalmologists Alfred Vogt from Switzerland and Yoshizo Koyanagi and Einosuke Harada from Japan. Several authors, including Arabic doctor Mohammad-al-Ghâfiqî in the 12th century, as well as Jacobi, Nettelship, and Tay in the 19th century, had described poliosis, neuralgias, and hearing disorders. This constellation was probably often due to sympathetic ophthalmia, but likely included examples of VKH. Koyanagi's first description of the disease was in 1914, but was preceded by Jujiro Komoto, professor of ophthalmology at the University of Tokyo, in 1911. A much later article, published in 1929, definitively associated Koyanagi with the disease. Harada's 1926 paper is recognized for its comprehensive description of what is now known as Vogt–Koyanagi–Harada disease.
