= Major arterial circle of the iris =

Major circulus arteriosus of iris

Details

Identifiers
- Latin: circulus arteriosus iridis major
- TA98: A15.2.03.034
- TA2: 4482
- FMA: 58529

Major arterial circle of the iris" (also: "major circulus arteriosus of iris", or "circulus arteriosus iridis major") is a circular artery of the eye formed by anastomoses of the anterior ciliary arteries and long posterior ciliary arteries at the ciliary body. It supplies arterial blood to the iris, ciliary processes of the ciliary body, and anterior choroid.

The major arterial circle of the iris is situated within the ciliary stroma in the anterior part of the ciliary body near the root of the iris.
