= Immune privilege =

Concept in biology

Certain sites of the mammalian body have immune privilege (no immune response), meaning they are able to tolerate the introduction of antigens without eliciting an inflammatory immune response. Tissue grafts are normally recognised as foreign antigens by the body and attacked by the immune system. However, in immune privileged sites, tissue grafts can survive for extended periods of time without rejection occurring. Immunologically privileged sites include:

- Eyes
- Placenta and fetus
- Testicles
- Central nervous system

It is thought that immune privilege also occurs to some extent—or is able to be induced in—articular cartilage. It was once thought that, theoretically, it could also occur (or be inducible) in the brain, but this is now known to be incorrect, as it has been shown that immune cells of the central nervous system contribute to the maintenance of neurogenesis and spatial learning abilities in adulthood.

Immune privilege is thought to be an evolutionary adaptation to protect vital structures from the potentially lethal effects of an inflammatory immune response in those regions. Inflammation in the brain or eye could cause the loss of organ functions, while immune responses directed against a fetus could cause miscarriage.

Immune privilege allows doctors to perform cornea transplants and knee meniscal transplantation.

== Mechanisms ==
Antigens from immune privileged regions have been found to interact with T cells in an unusual way: inducing tolerance of normally rejected stimuli. Immune privilege has emerged as an active rather than a passive process.

Physical structures surrounding privileged sites cause a lack of lymphatic drainage, limiting the immune system's ability to enter the site. Other factors that contribute to the maintenance of immune privilege include:

- Low expression of classical MHC class Ia molecules
- Expression of immunoregulatory nonclassical, low polymorphic class Ib MHC molecules
- Increased expression of surface molecules that inhibit complement activation
- Local production of immunosuppressive cytokines such as TGF-β
- Presence of neuropeptides
- Constitutive expression of Fas ligand that controls the entry of Fas-expressing lymphoid cells.

The nature of isolation of immunologically privileged sites from the rest of the body's immune system can cause them to become targets of autoimmune diseases or conditions, including sympathetic ophthalmia in the eye.

== Immunologically privileged sites ==
=== Eye ===
As well as the mechanisms that limit immune cell entry and induce immune suppression, the eye contains active immune cells that act upon the detection of foreign antigens. These cells interact with the immune system to induce unusual suppression of the systemic immune system response to an antigen introduced into the eye. This is known as anterior chamber associated immune deviation (ACAID).

Sympathetic ophthalmia is a rare disease which results from the isolation of the eye from the systemic immune system. Usually, trauma to one eye induces the release of eye antigens which are recognized and picked up by local antigen presenting cells (APC) such as macrophages and dendritic cells. These APC carry the antigen to local lymph nodes to be sampled by T cells and B cells. Entering the systemic immune system, these antigens are recognized as foreign and an immune response is mounted against them. The result is the sensitization of immune cells against a self-protein, causing an autoimmune attack on both the damaged eye and the non-damaged eye.

In this manner, the immune-privileged property has served to work against the eye instead. T cells normally encounter self-antigens during their development, when they move to the tissue draining lymph nodes. Anergy is induced in T cells which bind to self-antigens, deactivating them and preventing an autoimmune response in the future. However, the physical isolation of eye antigens results in the body's T cells never having encountered them at any time during development. Studies in mice have shown that the lack of presentation of eye self-antigens to specific T cells will fail to induce a sufficient amount of anergy to the self-antigens. While the lack of antigen presentation (due to the physical barriers) is sufficient to prevent the activation of autoreactive immune cells to the eye, the failure to induce sufficient anergy to T cells has detrimental results. In the case of damage or chance presentation to the immune system, the antigen presentation and immune response will occur at elevated rates.

=== Placenta and fetus ===
The mother's immune system is able to provide protection from microbial infections without mounting an immune response against fetal tissues expressing paternally inherited alloantigens. A better understanding of the immunology of pregnancy may lead to the discovery of reasons for miscarriage.

Regulatory T cells (Tregs) appear to be important in the maintenance of tolerance to fetal antigen. Increased numbers of Tregs are found during normal pregnancy. In both mouse models and humans diminished numbers of Tregs were associated with immunological rejection of the fetus and miscarriage. Experiments in mice involving the transfer of CD4+/CD25+ Treg cells from normal pregnant mice into abortion-prone animals resulted in the prevention of abortion. This confirmed the importance of these cells in maintaining immune privilege in the womb.

A number of theories exist as to the exact mechanism by which fetal tolerance is maintained. It has been proposed in recent literature that a tolerant microenvironment is created at the interface between the mother and fetus by regulatory T-cells producing "tolerant molecules". These molecules including heme oxygenase 1 (HO-1), leukaemia inhibitory factor (LIF), transforming growth factor β (TGF-β) and interleukin 10 (IL-10) have all been implicated in the induction of immune tolerance. Foxp3 and neuropillin are markers expressed by the regulatory T-cells by which they are identified.

=== Testes ===
Sperm are immunogenic – that is they will cause an autoimmune reaction if transplanted from the testis into a different part of the body. This has been demonstrated in experiments using rats by Lansteiner (1899) and Metchinikoff (1900), mice and guinea pigs. The likely reason for their immunogenicity or rather antigenicity is that sperm first mature at puberty, after central tolerance has been established, therefore the body recognizes them as foreign and mounts an immune reaction against them. Therefore, mechanisms for their protection must exist in this organ to prevent any autoimmune reaction. The blood–testis barrier is likely to contribute to the survival of sperm. However, it is believed in the field of testicular immunology that the blood–testis barrier cannot account for all immune suppression in the testis, due to (1) its incompleteness at a region called the rete testis and (2) the presence of immunogenic molecules outside the blood–testis barrier, on the surface of spermatogonia. The Sertoli cells play a crucial role in the protection of sperm from the immune system. They create the Sertoli cell barrier, which complements the blood-testis barrier. The protection is ensured by tight junctions, which appear between two neighboring Sertoli cells. Another mechanism which is likely to protect sperm is the suppression of immune responses in the testis.

=== Central nervous system ===
The central nervous system (CNS), which includes the brain and spinal cord, is a sensitive system with limited capacity for regeneration. In that regard, the concept of "immune privilege" within the CNS was once thought to be critical in limiting inflammation. The blood–brain barrier plays an important role in maintaining the separation of CNS from the systemic immune system but the presence of the blood–brain barrier, does not, on its own, provide immune privilege. It is thought that immune privilege within the CNS varies throughout the different compartments of the system, being most pronounced in the parenchyma tissue or "white matter".

The concept of CNS as an "immune-privileged" organ system, however, has been overwhelmingly challenged and re-evaluated over the last two decades. Current data not only indicate the presence of resident CNS macrophages (known as microglia) within the CNS, but there is also a wide body of evidence suggesting the active interaction of the CNS with peripheral immune cells.

Generally, in normal (uninjured) tissue, antigens are taken up by antigen presenting cells (dendritic cells), and subsequently transported to the lymph nodes. Alternatively, soluble antigens can drain into the lymph nodes. In contrast, in the CNS, dendritic cells are not thought to be present in normal parenchymal tissue or perivascular space although they are present in the meninges and choroids plexus. Thus, the CNS is thought to be limited in its capacity to deliver antigens to local lymph nodes and cause T-cell activation.

Although there is no conventional lymphatic system in the CNS, the drainage of antigens from CNS tissue into the cervical lymph nodes has been demonstrated. The response elicited in the lymph nodes to CNS antigens is skewed towards B-cells. Dendritic cells from cerebrospinal fluid have been found to migrate to B-cell follicles of cervical lymph nodes. The skewing of the response to antigen from the CNS towards a humoral response means that a more dangerous inflammatory T-cell response can be avoided.

The induction of systemic tolerance to an antigen introduced into the CNS has been previously shown. This was seen in the absence of the T-cell mediated inflammatory "delayed type hypersensitivity reaction" (DTH) when the antigen was reintroduced in another part of the body. This response is analogous to ACAID in the eye.

== Clinical applications ==
There is great potential for use of molecular mechanisms present in immune privileged sites in transplantations, especially allotransplantations. Compared to skin allografts, which are rejected in almost 100% of cases, corneal allografts survive long-term in 50–90% of cases. Immune privileged allografts survive even without immunosuppression, which is routinely applied to different tissue/organ recipients. Research suggests that the exploitation of anterior chamber-associated immune deviation (ACAID), aqueous humor and its anti-inflammatory properties and the induction of regulatory T cells (Treg) may lead to increased survival of allotransplants.

Another option of exploitation of immune privilege is gene therapy. Sertoli cells have already been used in research to produce insulin in live diabetic mice. The Sertoli cells were genetically engineered using recombinant lentivirus to produce insulin and then transplanted into mice. Even though the results were only short-term, the research team established that it is possible to use genetically engineered Sertoli cells in cell therapy.

Sertoli cells were also exploited in experiments for their immunosuppressive function. They were used to protect and nurture islets producing insulin to treat type I diabetes. The exploitation of Sertoli cells significantly increased the survival of transplanted islets. However, more experiments must be conducted before this method may be tested in human medicine as part of clinical trials. In another study on type II diabetic and obese mice, the transplantation of microencapsulated Sertoli cells in the subcutaneous abdominal fat depot lead to the return of normal glucose levels in 60% of the animals.

== History of research ==
The existence of immune privileged regions of the eye was recognized as early as the late 19th century and investigated by Peter Medawar. The original explanation of this phenomenon was that physical barriers around the immune privileged site enabled it to avoid detection from the immune system altogether, preventing the immune system from responding to any antigens present. More recent investigations have revealed a number of different mechanisms by which immune privileged sites interact with the immune system.
