= Pars ciliaris retinae =

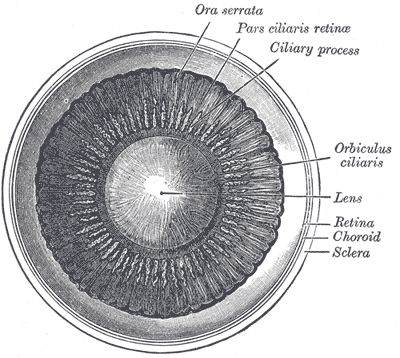
- The Interior of anterior half of bulb of eye.

Details

Identifiers
- Latin: Pars ciliaris retinae
- TA98: A15.2.04.004
- TA2: 6779
- FMA: 58610

The posterior surfaces of the ciliary processes are covered by a bilaminar layer of black pigment cells, which is continued forward from the retina, and is named the pars ciliaris retinae.
