= Koyanagi =

Koyanagi (written: 小柳 lit. "small willow") is a Japanese surname. Notable people with the surname include:

- Tsunekichi Koyanagi (小柳 常吉, born 1817), Japanese sumo wrestler
- Rumiko Koyanagi (小柳 ルミ子, born 1952), Japanese actress and singer
- Tatsushi Koyanagi (小柳 達司, born 1990), Japanese footballer
- Tomiji Koyanagi (小柳 富次, 1893–1978), Imperial Japanese Navy admiral
- Tomio Koyanagi (小柳 富男, born 1916), Japanese diver
- Yoshizo Koyanagi (小柳 美三, 1880–1954), Japanese ophthalmologist
- Yuki Koyanagi (小柳 ゆき, born 1982), Japanese pop singer

== See also ==
- Koyanagi Station, a railway station in Aomori, Aomori Prefecture, Japan
