= Einosuke Harada =

Japanese ophthalmologist (1892–1946)

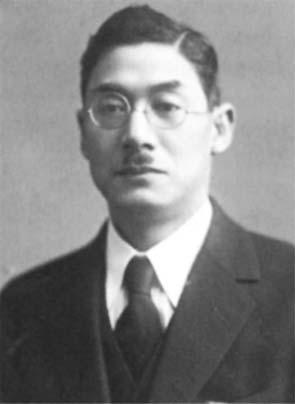
- Einosuke Harada
- Born: February 25, 1892; Amakusa District Kumamoto Prefecture, Japan
- Died: December 20, 1946 (aged 54); Nagasaki, Nagasaki Prefecture
- Occupations: Physician (First Internist, then Ophthalmologist), Army doctor
- Known for: Reported in detail a disease now called Vogt–Koyanagi–Harada syndrome

Einosuke Harada (原田 永之助, Harada Einosuke; February 25, 1892 – December 20, 1946) was a Japanese ophthalmologist who reported a condition now known as Vogt–Koyanagi–Harada disease.

== Career ==
He was born in Goryo, Amakusa District, Kumamoto Prefecture in 1892 and grew up in Taragi, Kuma District, and Kumamoto, Kumamoto Prefecture. While attending the Medical Faculty, Tokyo Imperial University, he became an army-doctor-to-be. He graduated from Tokyo University in 1917. After studying internal medicine, he entered the Department of Ophthalmology under Shinobu Ishihara in January, 1922.

In December 1922, he first reported "A case of acute diffuse choroiditis with retinal detachment" at a meeting of ophthalmologists in Tokyo; this work became a paper in 1926, recognized for its comprehensive description of what is now known as Vogt–Koyanagi–Harada disease.

He later worked in Nagasaki with his father-in-law, who was also an ophthalmologist. In 1937, he became an army doctor; he was later stationed in the Philippines. In 1945, his office was destroyed by A-bomb. On December 20, 1946, he died of pneumonia at the age of 54.
