= Iridoplegia =

Medical condition of the eye

Iridoplegia is the paralysis of the sphincter of the iris. It can occur in due to direct orbital injury, which may result in short lived blurred vision.

== Types ==
It can be of three types:

1. accommodative iridoplegia- Noncontraction of pupils during accommodation.
2. complete iridoplegia- Iris fails to respond to any stimulation.
3. reflex iridoplegia- The absence of light reflex, with retention of accommodation reflex. Also called Argyll Robertson pupil.

== Etiology ==
Iridoplegia has been reported in association with Guillain-Barré syndrome.
