= Anterior ciliary arteries =

Small arteries in the eye-socket

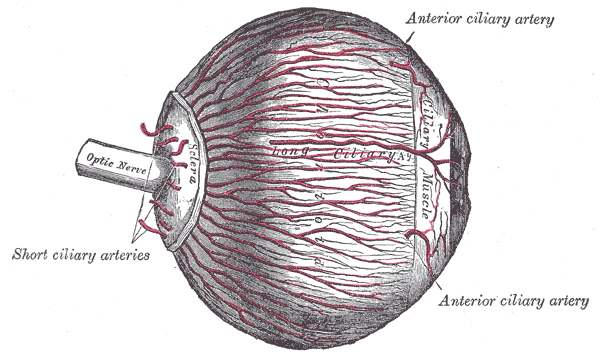
- The arteries of the choroid and iris. The greater part of the sclera has been removed.

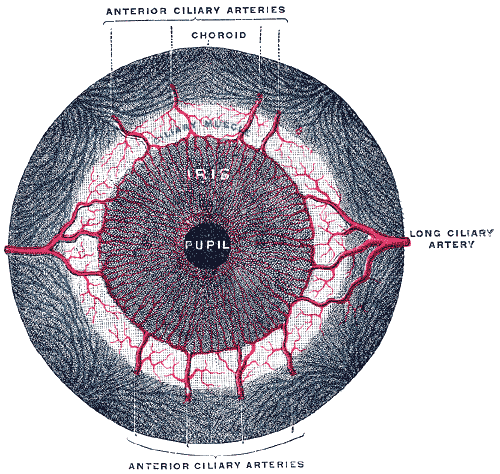
- Iris, front view.

Details
- Source: Ophthalmic artery
- Vein: Anterior ciliary veins
- Supplies: Conjunctiva, sclera and recti muscles

Identifiers
- Latin: arteriae ciliares anteriores
- TA98: A12.2.06.034
- TA2: 4485
- FMA: 49962 70782, 49962

The anterior ciliary arteries are seven arteries in each eye-socket that arise from muscular branches of the ophthalmic artery and supply the conjunctiva, sclera, rectus muscles, and the ciliary body. The arteries end by anastomosing with branches of the long posterior ciliary arteries to form the circulus arteriosus major.

== Anatomy ==
There are seven anterior ciliary arteries on each side of the body; two anterior ciliary arteries are associated with the superior, the medial, and the inferior rectus muscles, whereas the lateral rectus muscle is associated with only a single anterior ciliary artery.

=== Origin ===
The anterior ciliary arteries arise from muscular branches of the ophthalmic artery supplying the rectus muscles of the eye.

=== Course and relations ===
The anterior ciliary arteries exit the muscles near the muscles' insertions, passing anterior-ward alongside the rectus muscles' tendons before turning inward to perforate the sclera near the corneal limbus to reach the ciliary body. Upon reaching the ciliary body, they end by forming the circulus arteriosus major by anastomosing with branches of the long posterior ciliary arteries.

=== Branches and distribution ===
The anterior ciliary arteries contribute arterial blood supply to the rectus muscles, conjunctiva, sclera, and the ciliary body.

The anterior ciliary arteries issue branches to the conjunctiva before piercing the sclera, forming an artieral network in the limbal conjunctiva. They also issue branches to the episclera.

=== Anastomoses ===
Within the ciliary body, the anterior ciliary arteries anastomose with branches of the long posterior ciliary arteries to form the circulus arteriosus major.
