= Uvea =

Pigmented middle layer of the eyeball

- Graphical representation of an eyeball. The constituents of the uvea follow: iris (labeled as 9), ciliary body (labeled as 3), and choroid (labeled as 28.)

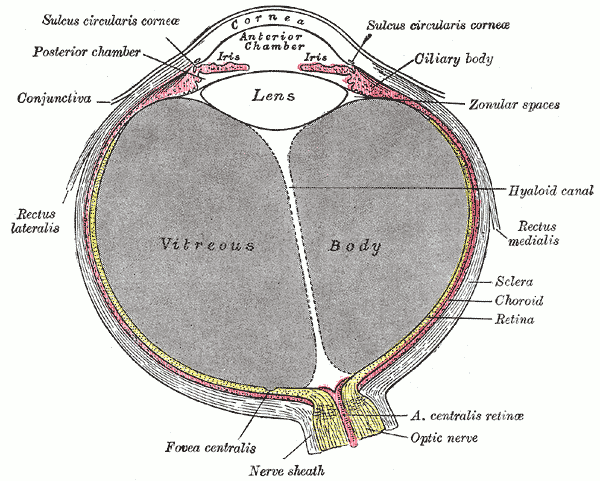
- Horizontal section of the eyeball. The constituents of the uvea follow: iris labeled at top, ciliary body labeled at upper right, and choroid labeled at center right.)

Details
- Part of: The human eye
- System: Sensory nervous system
- Location: Lies between the corneosclera (outermost layer of the eye) and the retina (innermost layer/in the back of the eye

Identifiers
- Latin: tunica vasculosa bulbi
- MeSH: D014602
- TA98: A15.2.03.001
- TA2: 6752
- FMA: 58103

The uvea (/ˈjuːviə/; from Latin uva 'grape'), also called the uveal layer, uveal coat, uveal tract, vascular tunic or vascular layer, is the pigmented middle layer of the three concentric layers that make up an eye, precisely between the inner retina and the outer fibrous layer composed of the sclera and cornea.

== History and etymology ==
The originally medieval Latin term comes from the Latin word uva ("grape") and is a reference to its grape-like appearance (reddish-blue or almost black colour, wrinkled appearance and grape-like size and shape when stripped intact from a cadaveric eye). In fact, it is a partial loan translation of the Ancient Greek term for the choroid, which literally means “covering resembling a grape”. Its use as a technical term for part of the eye is ancient, but it only referred to the choroid in Middle English and before.

== Structure ==
=== Regions ===
The uvea is the vascular middle layer of the eye. It is traditionally divided into three areas, from front to back:

- Iris
- Ciliary body
- Choroid

== Function ==
The prime functions of the uveal tract as a unit are:

- Nutrition and gas exchange: uveal vessels directly perfuse the ciliary body and iris, to support their metabolic needs, and indirectly supply diffusible nutrients to the outer retina, sclera, and lens, which lack any intrinsic blood supply. (The cornea has no adjacent blood vessels and is oxygenated by direct gas exchange with the environment.)
- Light absorption: the uvea improves the contrast of the retinal image by reducing reflected light within the eye (analogous to the black paint inside a camera), and also absorbs outside light transmitted through the sclera, which is not fully opaque.

In addition, some uveal regions have special functions of great importance, including secretion of the aqueous humour by the ciliary processes, control of accommodation (focus) by the ciliary body, and optimisation of retinal illumination by the iris's control over the pupil. Many of these functions are under the control of the autonomic nervous system.

== Pharmacology ==
The pupil provides a visible example of the neural feedback control in the body. This is subserved by a balance between the antagonistic sympathetic and parasympathetic divisions of the autonomic nervous system. Informal pharmacological experiments have been performed on the pupil for centuries, since the pupil is readily visible, and its size can be readily altered by applying drugs—even crude plant extracts—to the cornea. Pharmacological control over pupil size remains an important part of the treatment of some ocular diseases.

Drugs can also reduce the metabolically active process of secreting aqueous humour, which is important in treating both acute and chronic glaucoma.

== Immunology ==
The normal uvea consists of immune competent cells, particularly lymphocytes, and is prone to respond to inflammation by developing lymphocytic infiltrates. A rare disease called sympathetic ophthalmia may represent 'cross-reaction' between the uveal and retinal antigens (i.e., the body's inability to distinguish between them, with resulting misdirected inflammatory reactions).

== Clinical significance ==
See uveitis, choroiditis, iritis, iridocyclitis, anterior uveitis, sympathetic ophthalmia, and uveal melanoma.
