= Dysacusis =

Hearing impairment

Dysacusis is a hearing impairment characterized by difficulty in processing details of sound due to distortion in frequency or intensity rather than primarily a loss of the ability to perceive sound. The term is sometimes used to describe pain or discomfort due to sound, a condition also known as auditory dysaesthesia.
