= Yoshizo Koyanagi =

Japanese ophthalmologist

Yoshizo Koyanagi (小柳 美三, Koyanagi Yoshizō; December 10, 1880 – 1954) was a Japanese ophthalmologist who is recognized for his description of what is now known as Vogt–Koyanagi–Harada disease (VKH).

Koyanagi received his medical education at the Imperial University in Kyoto. He graduated in 1908 and studied ophthalmology under Ikujiro Asayama. He held a variety of positions, eventually retiring in 1942. In recognition of his contributions, the government posthumously conferred on him the Order of the Sacred Treasure, Second Class.

His first description of what is now known as Vogt–Koyanagi–Harada disease was in 1914. This was preceded by Jujiro Komoto, Professor of Ophthalmology at the University of Tokyo, in 1911. However, Koyanagi became definitively associated with VKH in 1929, when he published an article in which he typified the time course of the disease as it went through its sequential phases.
