= Short posterior ciliary arteries =

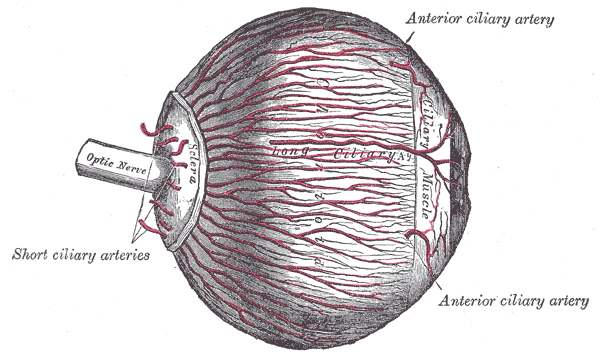
- The arteries of the choroid and iris. The greater part of the sclera has been removed.

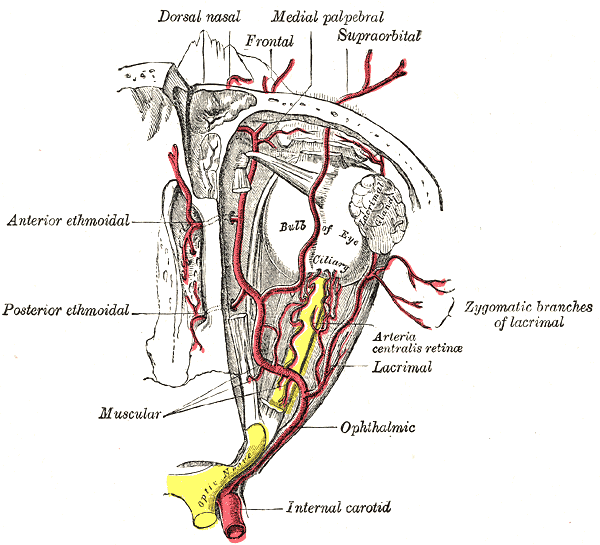
- The ophthalmic artery and its branches

Details
- Source: Ophthalmic artery
- Vein: Vorticose veins
- Supplies: Choroid (up to the equator of the eye) ciliary processes

Identifiers
- Latin: arteriae ciliares posteriores breves
- TA98: A12.2.06.031
- TA2: 4479
- FMA: 70777

The short posterior ciliary arteries are a number of branches of the ophthalmic artery. They pass forward with the optic nerve to reach the eyeball, piercing the sclera around the entry of the optic nerve into the eyeball.

== Anatomy ==
The number of short posterior ciliary arteries varies between individuals; one or more short posterior ciliary arteries initially branch off the ophthalmic artery, subsequently dividing to form up to 20 short posterior ciliary arteries.

=== Origin ===
The short posterior ciliary arteries branch off the ophthalmic artery as it crosses the optic nerve medially.

=== Course and relations ===
About 7 short posterior ciliary arteries accompany the optic nerve, passing anterior-ward to reach the posterior part of the eyeball, where they divide into 15-20 branches and pierce the sclera around the entrance of the optic nerve.

=== Distribution ===
The short posterior ciliary arteries contribute arterial supply to the choroid, ciliary processes, optic disc, the outer retina, and Bruch's membrane.

Some branches of the short posterior ciliary arteries supply the optic disc by means of an anastomotic ring - the circle of Zinn-Haller or circle of Zinn - which is associated with the fibrous extension of the ocular tendons (common tendinous ring (also annulus of Zinn)).

== Additional images ==
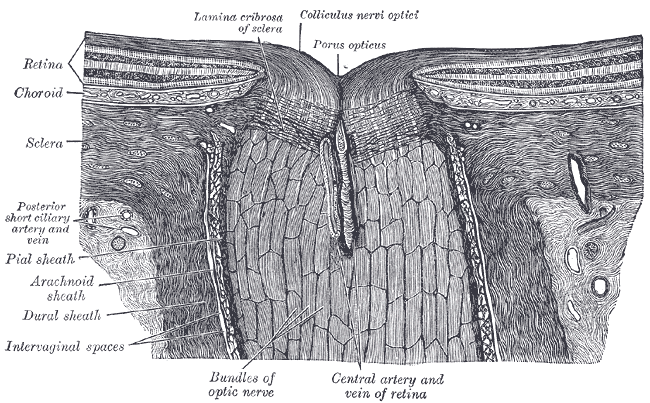
The terminal portion of the optic nerve and its entrance into the eyeball, in horizontal section

== See also ==
- Long posterior ciliary arteries
- Anterior ciliary arteries
