= Stroma of iris =

Connective and vascular tissue of the iris

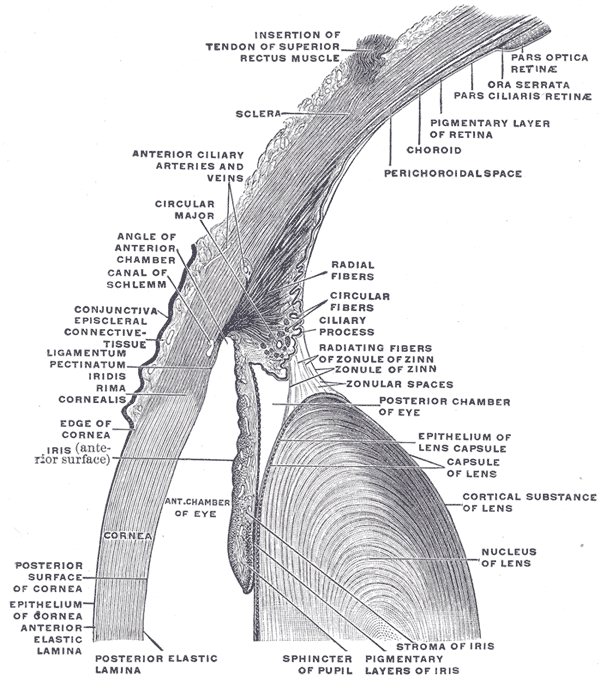
- The upper half of a sagittal section through the front of the eyeball. ("Stroma of iris" labeled at bottom right.)

Details

Identifiers
- Latin: stroma iridis
- TA98: A15.2.03.031
- FMA: 58526

The stroma of the iris is a fibrovascular layer of tissue located at the front of the iris.

== Structure ==
The stroma is a delicate interlacement of fibres. Some circle the circumference of the iris and the majority radiate toward the pupil. Blood vessels and nerves intersperse this mesh.

In dark eyes, the stroma often contains pigment granules. Blue eyes and the eyes of albinos, however, lack pigment.

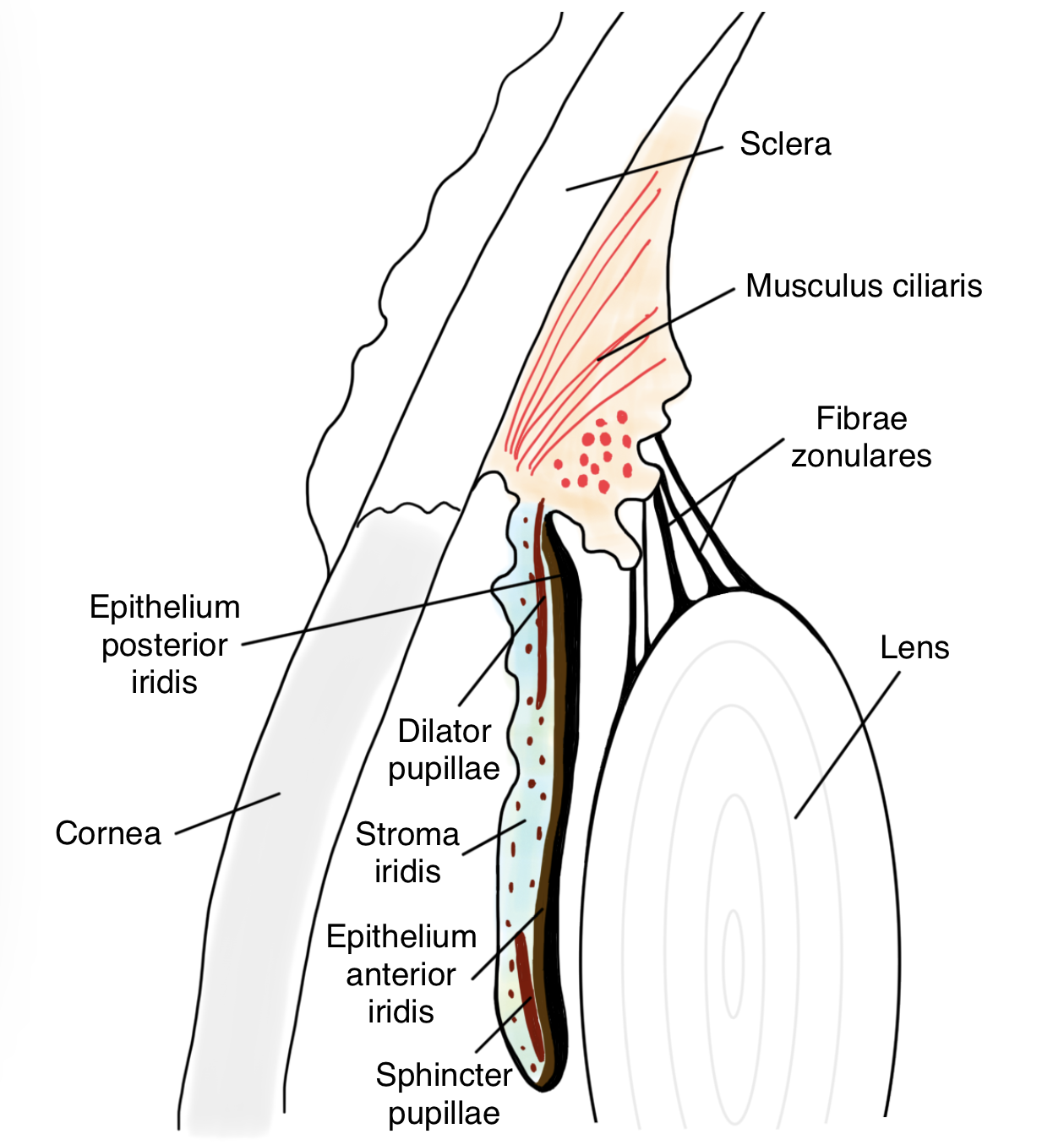
Structure of the iris and surrounding parts showing the stroma of iris (stroma iridis).

The stroma connects to a sphincter muscle (sphincter pupillae), which contracts the pupil in a circular motion, and a set of dilator muscles (dilator pupillae) which pull the iris radially to enlarge the pupil, pulling it in folds. The back surface is covered by a commonly, heavily pigmented epithelial layer that is two cells thick (the iris pigment epithelium), but the front surface has no epithelium. This anterior surface projects as the muscles dilate.
