= Poliosis =

Abnormal patches of white hair

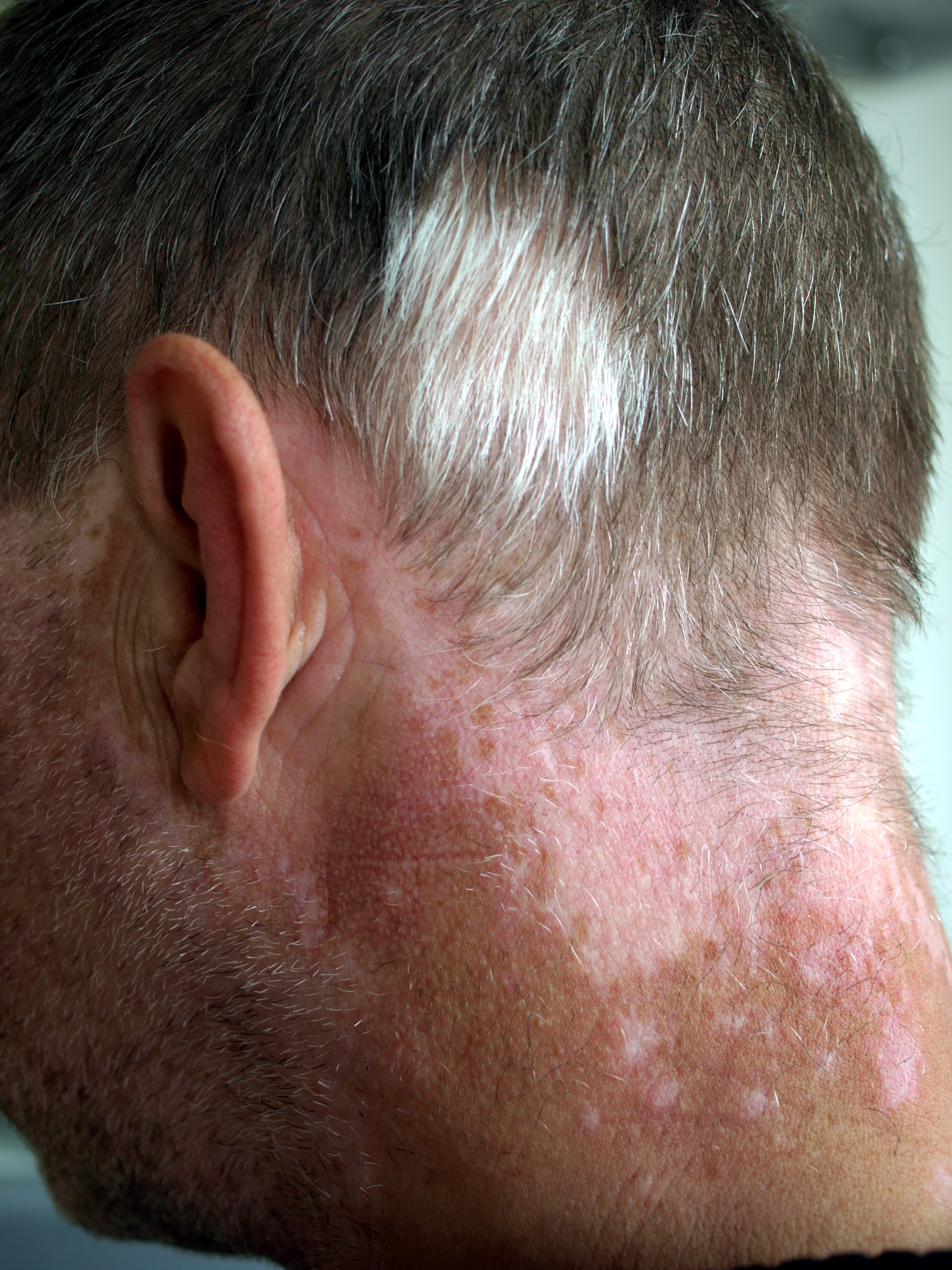
- Depigmentation of sections of skin and hair in 48-year-old man with vitiligo and poliosis
- Specialty: Dermatology

Poliosis circumscripta is a condition characterized by localized patches of white hair due to a reduction or absence of melanin in hair follicles. Although traditionally associated with the scalp, poliosis can affect any hairy area on the body, including eyebrows, eyelashes, and beards. Microscopically, poliosis is marked by the lack of melanin or melanocytes in the hair bulbs, though epidermal melanocytes typically remain unaffected unless associated with conditions like vitiligo. It is commonly referred to as a "white forelock", and sometimes as a "Mallen streak" after Catherine Cookson's The Mallen Streak, which features it.

== Etiology ==
=== Genetic causes ===
Poliosis can be congenital and often occurs in the context of various genetic syndromes. These disorders are typically linked to other systemic manifestations.

- Tuberous Sclerosis Complex (TSC): TSC is a genetic condition that leads to the formation of benign tumors in multiple organs. Dermatological signs such as hypomelanotic macules and facial angiofibromas are common, and poliosis can occasionally be an early indicator of TSC.
- Piebaldism: This rare genetic disorder is characterized by a congenital absence of melanocytes in certain areas of the skin and hair, leading to white patches or forelocks. It results from mutations in the KIT gene, which affects the migration of melanoblasts during development.
- Waardenburg Syndrome: This neural crest disorder is associated with sensorineural hearing loss and pigmentary anomalies, including white forelocks and patches of depigmentation on the skin. Poliosis is a common manifestation.

=== Acquired causes ===
In addition to genetic factors, poliosis can develop due to various inflammatory, autoimmune, or neoplastic conditions, or as a side effect of medication.

- Vitiligo: This autoimmune disorder leads to the destruction of melanocytes, resulting in depigmented skin patches. Poliosis is present in half of patients with segmental vitiligo.
- Vogt–Koyanagi–Harada disease (VKH): VKH is a systemic autoimmune disorder affecting melanin-containing tissues, leading to uveitis, meningitis, and poliosis, which often involves the eyebrows and eyelashes.
- Alopecia areata (AA): Poliosis may emerge in patients with AA as pigmented hair selectively falls out or during hair regrowth.
- Sarcoidosis: This systemic inflammatory disease can affect the eyes and skin, leading to poliosis, particularly in patients with uveitis.
- Neoplasms and medication-induced poliosis: Poliosis has been associated with melanocytic lesions such as congenital or acquired nevi and melanoma. Additionally, poliosis is a rare side effect of certain medications, including topical prostaglandin analogs (used in glaucoma treatment) and systemic drugs like chloroquine and acitretin.

== Differential diagnosis ==
Several genetic and acquired disorders can mimic poliosis, and they should be considered during diagnosis:

- Oculocutaneous albinism (OCA): A group of inherited disorders that affect melanin production, causing pale skin, hair, and eyes.
- Griscelli syndrome: A rare genetic condition characterized by pigmentary dilution and immunodeficiency.
- Chediak-Higashi syndrome: This genetic disorder results in pigmentary abnormalities and immune system dysfunction.
- Hermansky-Pudlak syndrome: A rare genetic disorder causing albinism, bleeding disorders, and lung fibrosis.
- White piedra: A superficial fungal infection that can cause hair to appear white, resembling poliosis.

== Known cases ==
British professional tennis player Cameron Norrie, who reached a career-high ranking of world No. 8, has poliosis and first noticed natural white streaks appearing in his hair at age 21.
