= Long posterior ciliary arteries =

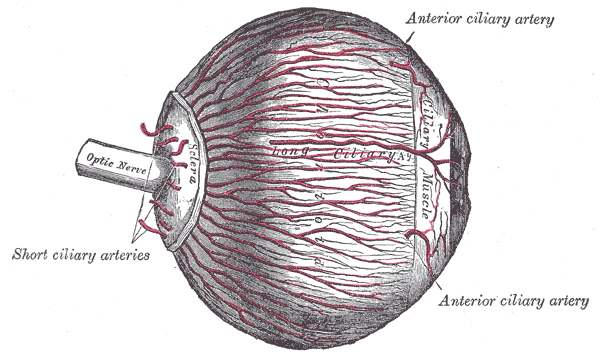
- The arteries of the choroid and iris. The greater part of the sclera has been removed.

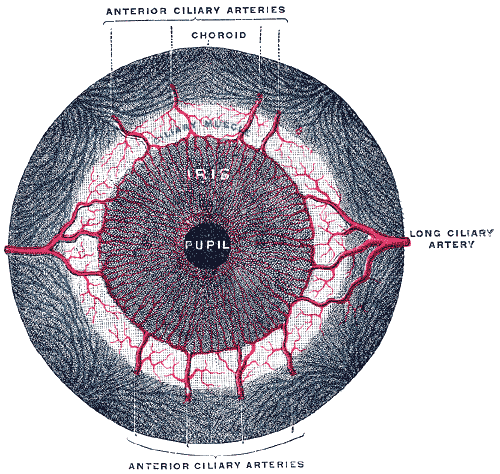
- Iris, front view.

Details
- Source: Ophthalmic artery
- Supplies: Iris ciliary body choroid

Identifiers
- Latin: arteriae ciliares posteriores longae
- TA98: A12.2.06.032
- TA2: 4481
- FMA: 70778

The long posterior ciliary arteries are arteries of the orbit. There are long posterior ciliary arteries two on each side of the body. They are branches of the ophthalmic artery. They pass forward within the eye to reach the ciliary body where they ramify and anastomose with the anterior ciliary arteries, thus forming the major arterial circle of the iris.The long posterior ciliary arteries contribute arterial supply to the choroid, ciliary body, and iris.

== Anatomy ==
There are two long ciliary arteries. They are branches of the ophthalmic artery.

=== Course and relations ===
The long posterior ciliary arteries first run near the optic nerve before piercing the posterior sclera near the optic nerve. They pass anterior-ward - one along each side of the eyeball - between the sclera and choroid to reach the ciliary muscle where they divide into two branches which go on to form the major arterial circle of the iris.

=== Anastomoses ===
Non-terminal branches of the long posterior ciliary arteries anastomose with branches of the short posterior ciliary arteries.

Upon reaching the ciliary body, the long posterior ciliary arteries ramify superiorly and inferiorly, the branches forming anastomoses with each other and with those of the anterior ciliary arteries to form the major arterial circle of the iris.

=== Distribution ===
The long posterior ciliary arteries supply the choroid, ciliary body, and iris.

Non-terminal branches are distributed to the ciliary muscle/ciliary body, and anterior choroid. Terminal branches are distributed to the iris and ciliary body via the major arterial circle of the iris.

== See also ==
- Short posterior ciliary arteries
