= Iris (anatomy) =

Colored part of an eye

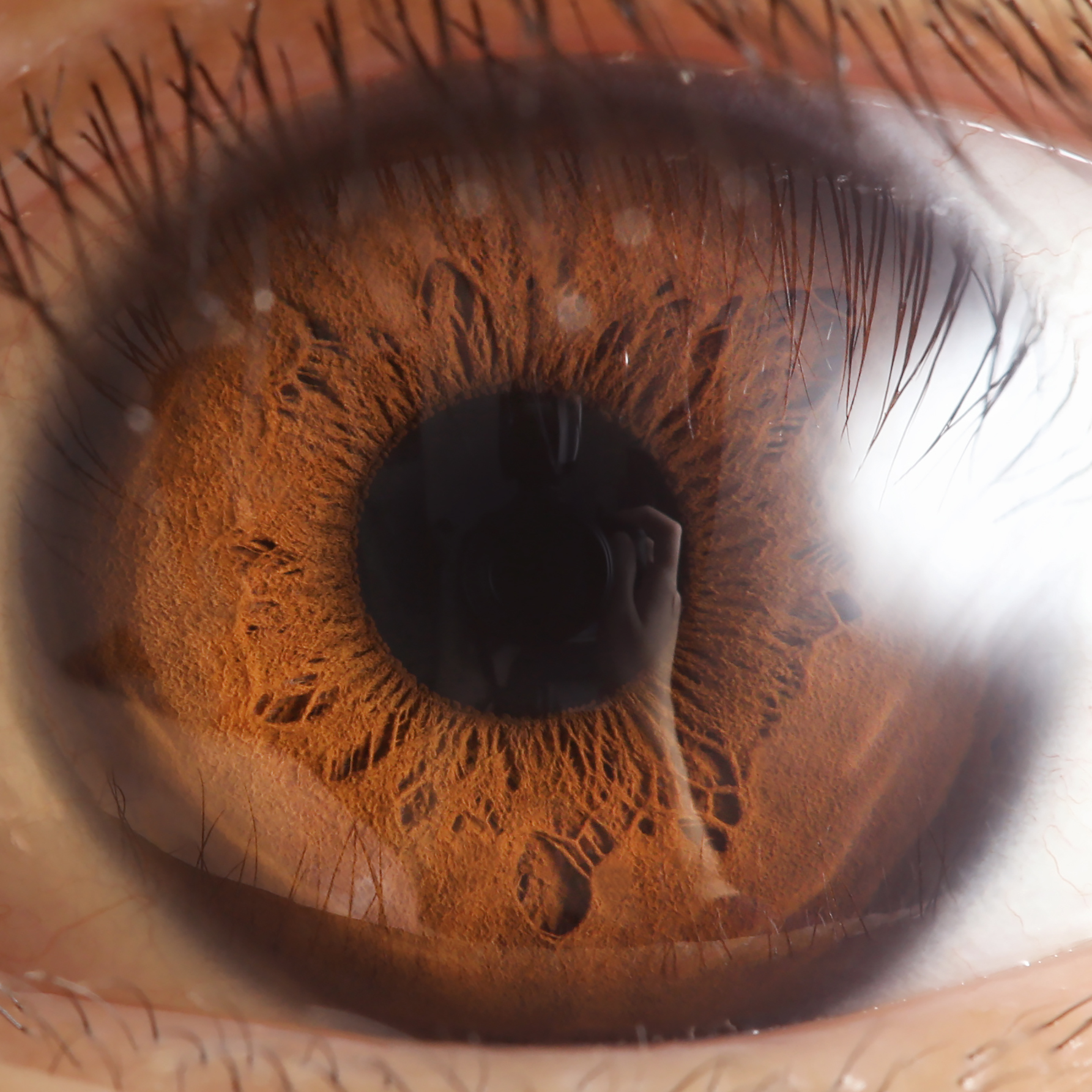
- The iris in humans is the colored (typically brown, blue, or green) area, with the pupil (the circular black spot) in its center, and surrounded by the white sclera.

- Schematic diagram of the human eye (iris labeled at upper right)

Details
- Precursor: Mesoderm and neural ectoderm
- Part of: Front of eye
- System: Visual system
- Artery: Long posterior ciliary arteries
- Nerve: Long ciliary nerves, short ciliary nerves

Identifiers
- Latin: iris
- MeSH: D007498
- TA98: A15.2.03.020
- TA2: 6753
- FMA: 58235

The iris (pl.: irides or irises) is a thin, ring-shaped structure in the eye in most mammals and birds that is responsible for controlling the diameter and size of the pupil, and thus the amount of light reaching the retina. In optical terms, the pupil is the eye's aperture, while the iris is the diaphragm. Eye color is defined by the iris.

== Etymology ==
The word "iris" is derived from "ἶρις", the Greek word for "rainbow", as well as Iris, goddess of the rainbow in the Iliad, due to the many colors the human iris can take.

== Structure ==
The iris consists of two layers: the front pigmented fibrovascular layer known as a stroma and, behind the stroma, pigmented epithelial cells.

The stroma is connected to a sphincter muscle (sphincter pupillae), which contracts the pupil in a circular motion, and a set of dilator muscles (dilator pupillae), which pull the iris radially to enlarge the pupil, pulling it in folds.

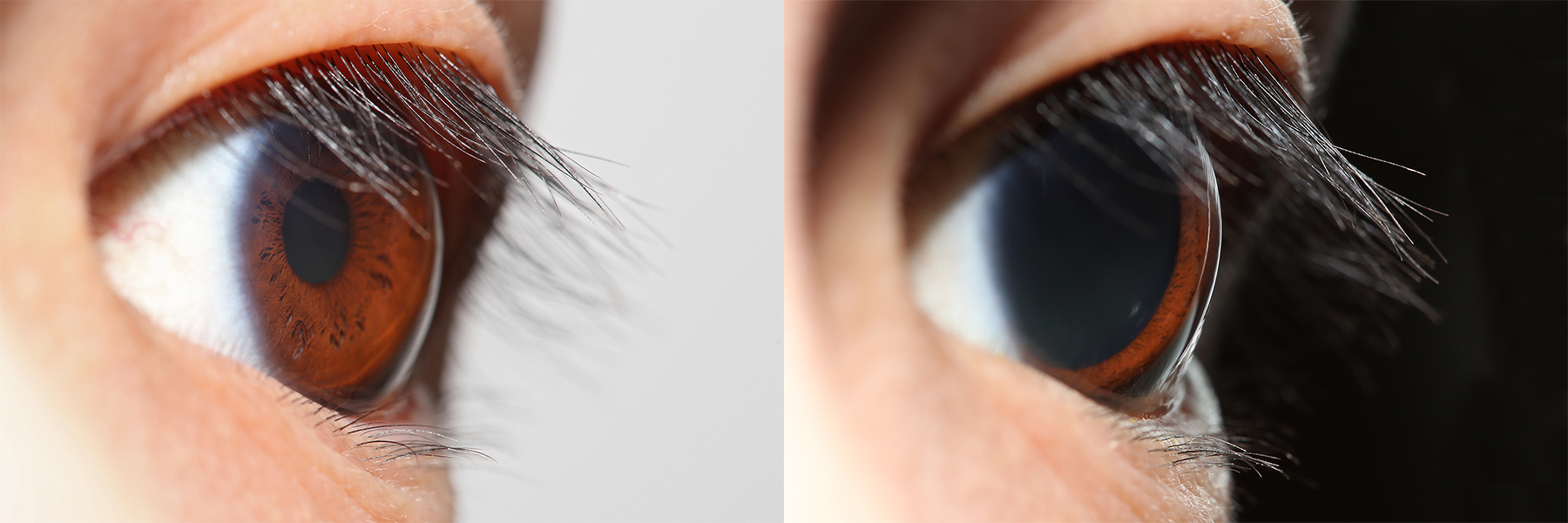
The iris (brown coloured portion of the eye) controls the size of the pupil by contracting the sphincter pupillae and dilator pupillae muscles.

The sphincter pupillae is the opposing muscle of the dilator pupillae. The pupil's diameter, and thus the inner border of the iris, changes size when constricting or dilating. The outer border of the iris does not change size. The constricting muscle is located on the inner border.

The back surface is covered by a heavily pigmented epithelial layer that is two cells thick (the iris pigment epithelium), but the front surface has no epithelium. This anterior surface projects as the dilator muscles. The high pigment content blocks light from passing through the iris to the retina, restricting it to the pupil. The outer edge of the iris, known as the root, is attached to the sclera and the anterior ciliary body. The iris and ciliary body together are known as the anterior uvea. Just in front of the root of the iris is the region referred to as the trabecular meshwork, through which the aqueous humour constantly drains out of the eye, with the result that diseases of the iris often have important effects on intraocular pressure and indirectly on vision. The iris along with the anterior ciliary body provide a secondary pathway for aqueous humour to drain from the eye.

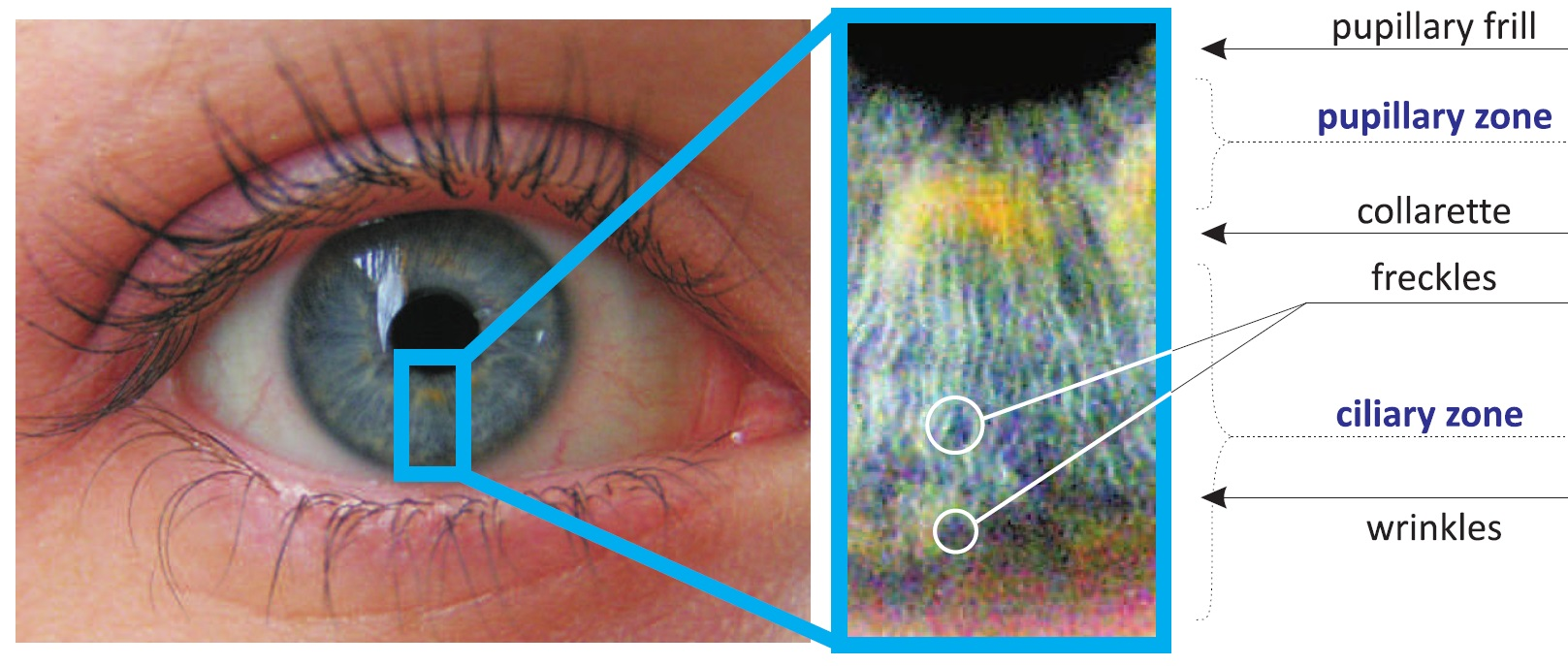

The iris is divided into two major regions:

1. The pupillary zone is the inner region whose edge forms the boundary of the pupil.
2. The ciliary zone is the rest of the iris that extends to its origin at the ciliary body.

The collarette is the thickest region of the iris, separating the pupillary portion from the ciliary portion. The collarette is a vestige of the coating of the embryonic pupil. It is typically defined as the region where the sphincter muscle and dilator muscle overlap. Radial ridges extend from the periphery to the pupillary zone, to supply the iris with blood vessels. The root of the iris is the thinnest and most peripheral.

The muscle cells of the iris are smooth muscle in mammals and amphibians, but are striated muscle in reptiles (including birds). Many fish have neither, and, as a result, their irises are unable to dilate and contract, so that the pupil always remains of a fixed size.

=== Front ===
- The crypts of Fuchs are a series of openings located on either side of the collarette that allow the stroma and deeper iris tissues to be bathed in aqueous humor. Collagen trabeculae that surround the border of the crypts can be seen in blue irises.
- The midway between the collarette and the origin of the iris: These folds result from changes in the surface of the iris as it dilates.
- Crypts on the base of the iris are additional openings that can be observed close to the outermost part of the ciliary portion of the iris.

=== Back ===
- The radial contraction folds of Schwalbe are a series of very fine radial folds in the pupillary portion of the iris extending from the pupillary margin to the collarette. They are associated with the scalloped appearance of the pupillary ruff.
- The structural folds of Schwalbe are radial folds extending from the border of the ciliary and pupillary zones that are much broader and more widely spaced, continuous with the "valleys" between the ciliary processes.
- Some of the circular contraction folds are a fine series of ridges that run near the pupillary margin and vary in thickness of the iris pigment epithelium; others are in ciliary portion of iris.

=== Microanatomy ===
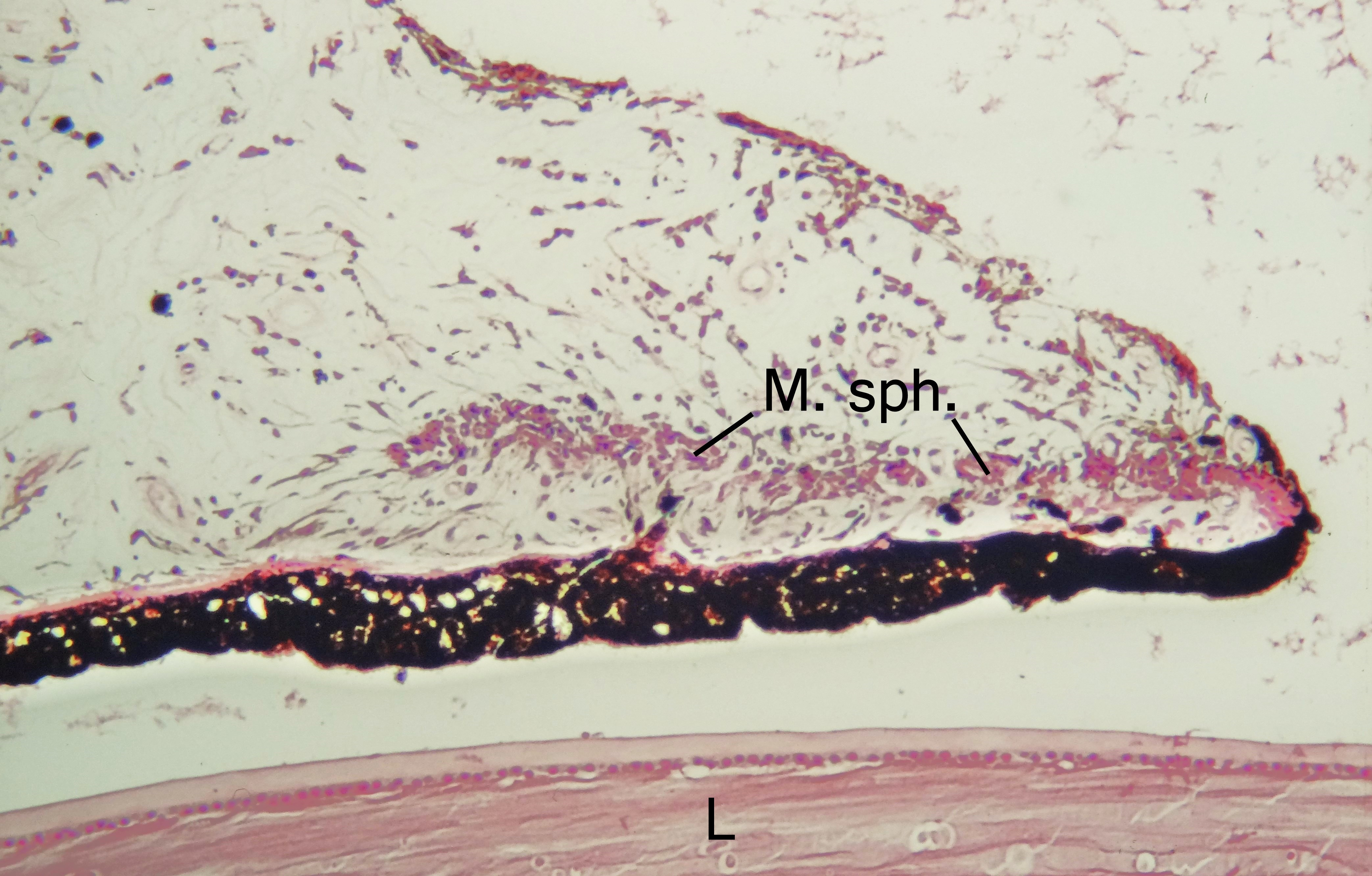
Light micrograph of the iris near to the pupil. M. sph. sphincter muscle, L lens

Constriction of the pupil (miosis) observed by laser Doppler imaging reveals radial vessels of the iris.

A human eye demonstrating its owner's rare ability to voluntarily dilate and constrict his pupil on command, via voluntary control of his iris muscles.

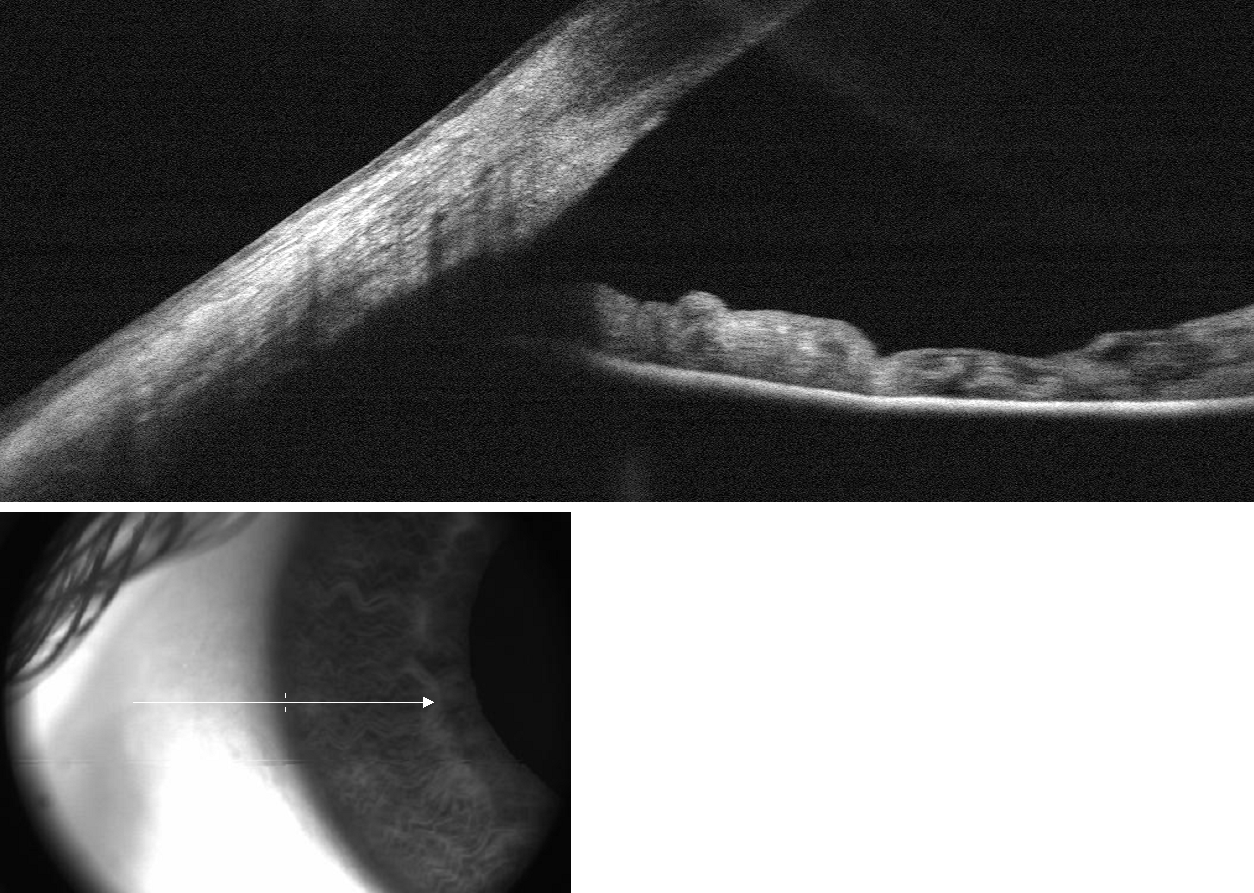
Anterior chamber cross-section imaged by an SD-OCT.

From anterior (front) to posterior (back), the layers of the iris are:

- Anterior limiting layer
- Stroma of iris
- Iris sphincter muscle
- Iris dilator muscle (myoepithelium)
- Anterior pigment epithelium
- Posterior pigment epithelium

=== Development ===
The stroma and the anterior border layer of the iris are derived from the neural crest, and behind the stroma of the iris, the sphincter pupillae and dilator pupillae muscles, as well as the iris epithelium, develop from optic cup neuroectoderm.

== Function ==
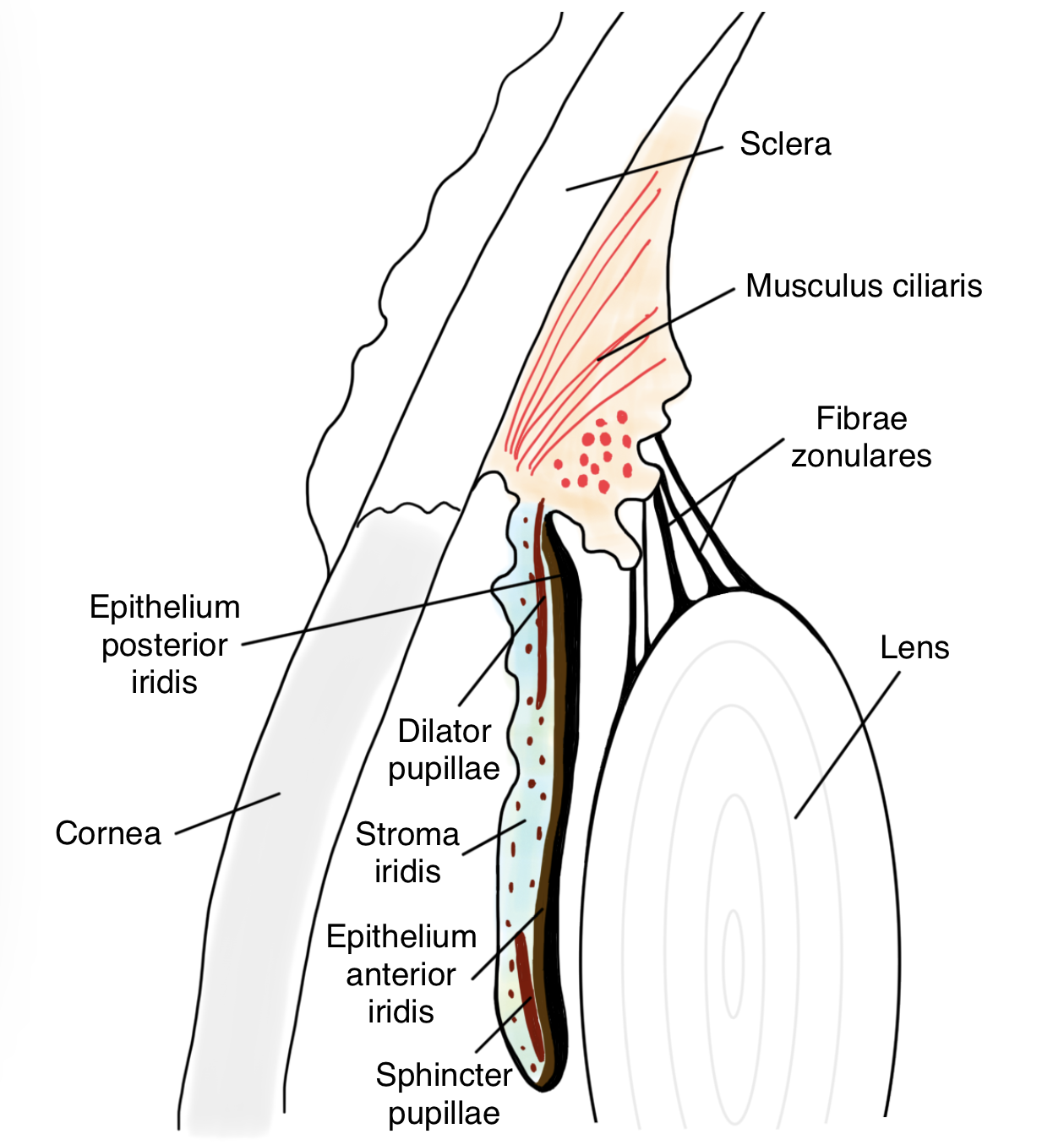
Structure of the iris and surrounding parts showing the dilator and sphincter muscles (dilator pupillae and sphincter pupillae).

The iris controls the size of the pupil by means of contracting the iris sphincter muscle and/or the iris dilator muscle. The size of the pupils is dependent on many factors (including light, emotional state, cognitive load, arousal, stimulation), and can range from less than 2 mm in diameter, to as large as 9 mm in diameter. However, there is considerable variation in maximal pupil diameter by individual humans, and decreases with age. The irises also contract the pupils when accommodation is initiated, to increase the depth of field.

Very few humans possess the ability to exert direct voluntary control over their iris muscles, which grants them the ability to dilate and constrict their pupils on command. However, there is no clear purpose or advantage to this.

== Eye color ==
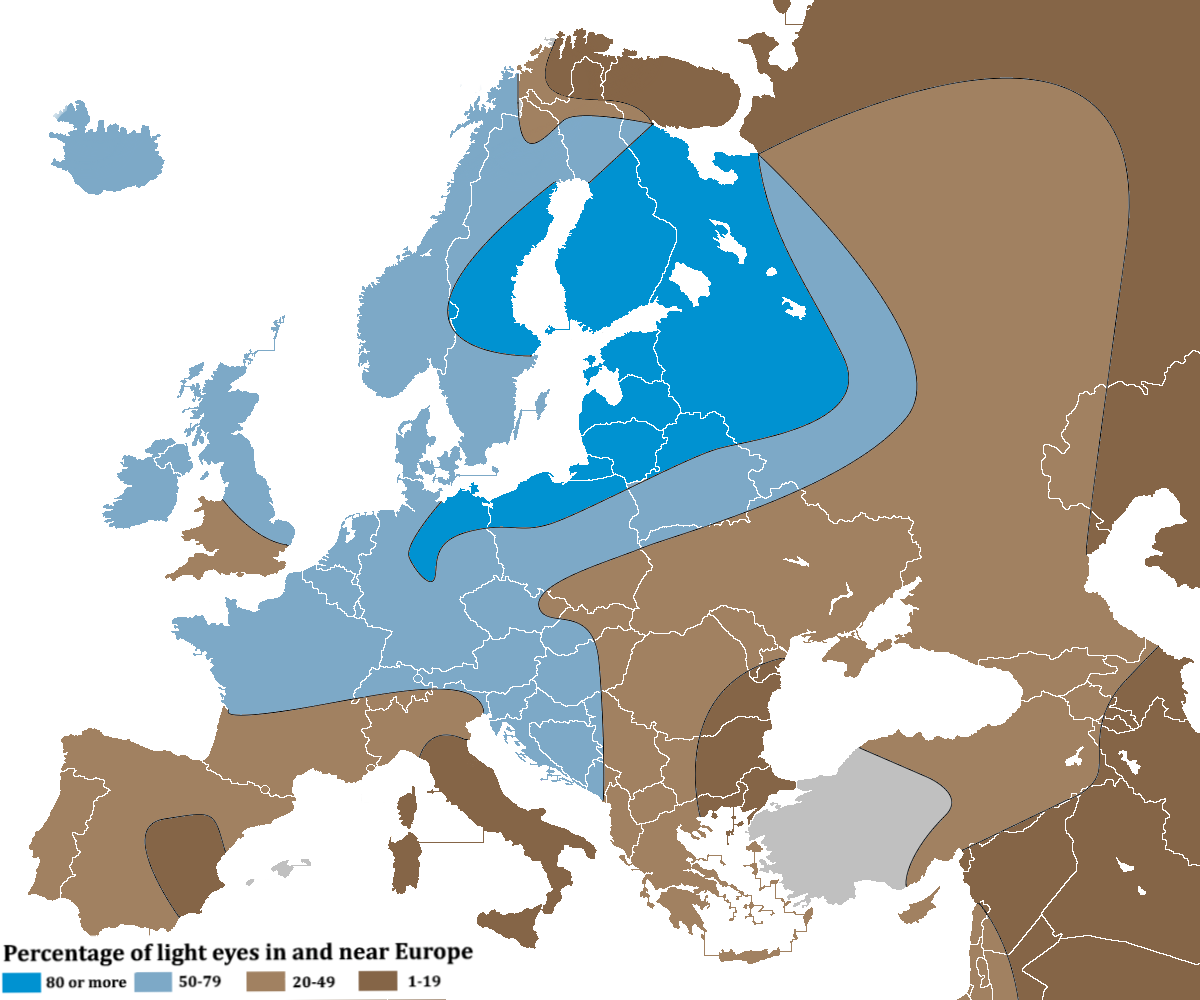
Human eye pigmentation in Europe

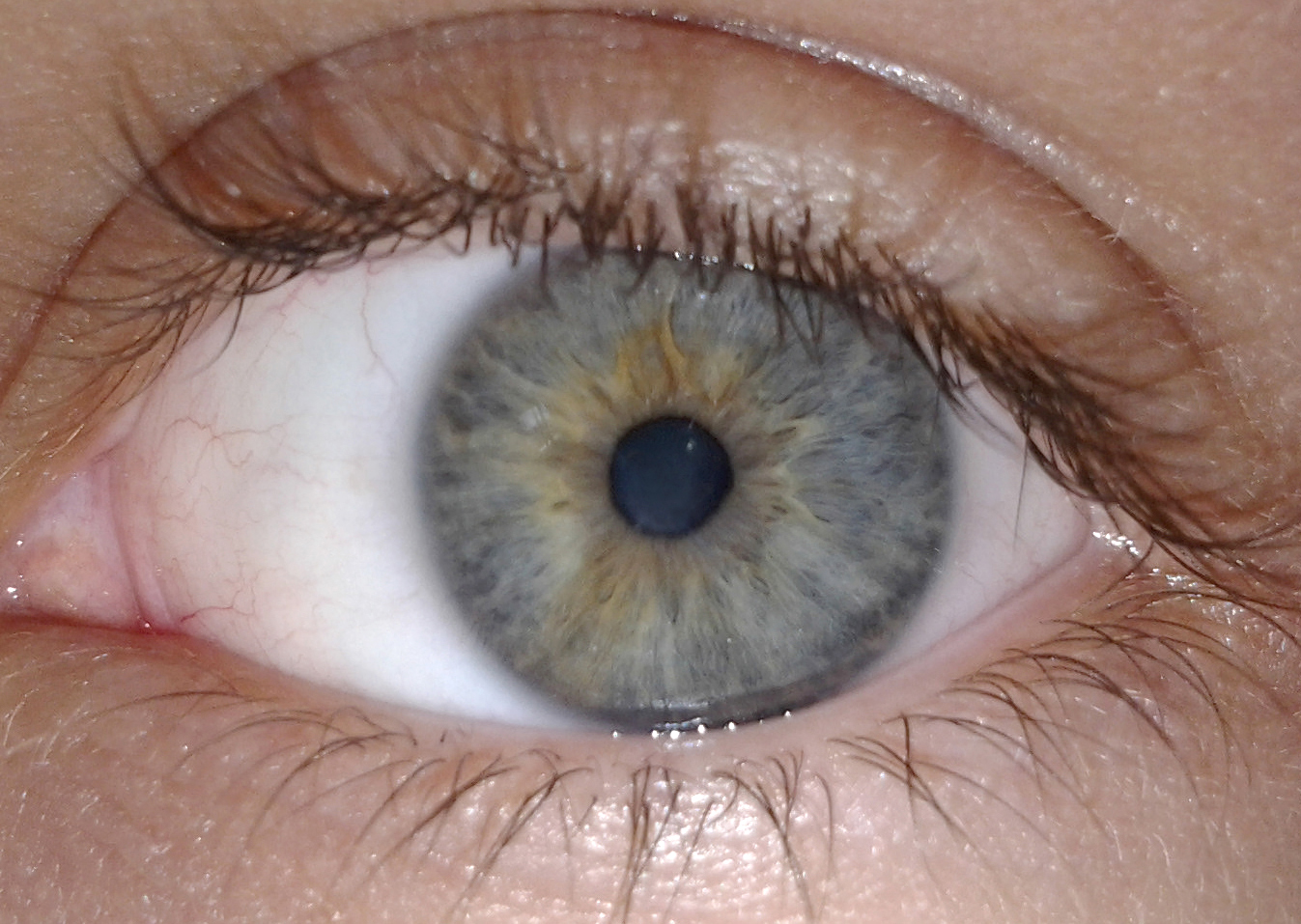
Among human phenotypes, blue-green-gray eyes are a relatively rare eye color and the exact color is often perceived to vary according to its surroundings.

The iris is usually strongly pigmented, with the color typically ranging between brown, hazel, green, gray, and blue. Occasionally, the color of the iris is due to a lack of pigmentation, as in the pinkish-white of oculocutaneous albinism, or to obscuration of its pigment by blood vessels, as in the red of an abnormally vascularised iris. Despite the wide range of colors, the only pigment that contributes substantially to normal iris color is the dark pigment melanin. The quantity of melanin pigment in the iris is one factor in determining the phenotypic eye color of an organism. Structurally, this huge molecule is only slightly different from its equivalent found in skin and hair. Iris color is due to variable amounts of eumelanin (brown/black melanins) and pheomelanin (red/yellow melanins) produced by melanocytes. More of the former is found in brown-eyed people and of the latter in blue- and green-eyed people. The limbal ring appears as a dark ring encircling the iris on some individuals, but is a result of the optical properties of the region between the cornea and sclera, not of pigments in the iris.

=== Genetic and physical factors determining iris color ===
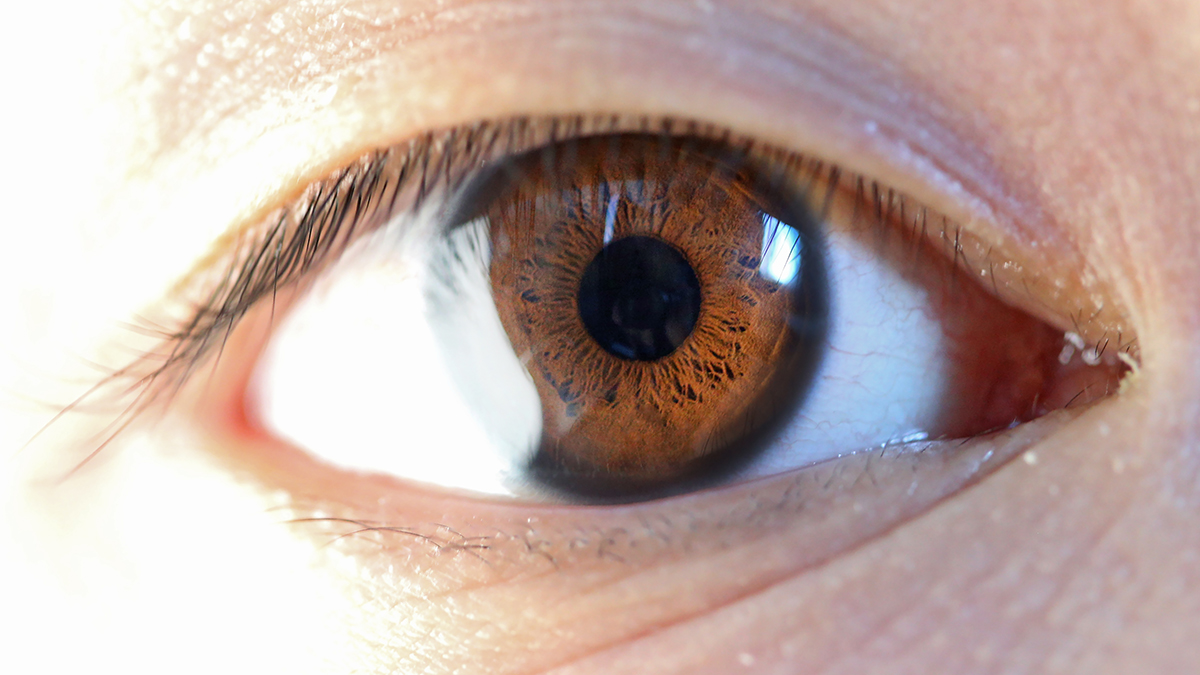
A light brown iris with prominent limbal ring. Light brown irises contain pheomelanin.

Iris color is a highly complex phenomenon consisting of the combined effects of texture, pigmentation, fibrous tissue, and blood vessels within the iris stroma, which together make up an individual's epigenetic constitution in this context. An organism's "eye color" is actually the color of one's iris, the cornea being transparent and the white sclera entirely outside the area of interest.

Melanin is yellowish to dark hazel in the stromal pigment cells, and black in the iris pigment epithelium, which lies in a thin but very opaque layer across the back of the iris. Most human irises also show a condensation of the brownish stromal melanin in the thin anterior border layer, which by its position has an overt influence on the overall color. The degree of dispersion of the melanin, which is in subcellular bundles called melanosomes, has some influence on the observed color, but melanosomes in the iris of humans and other vertebrates are not mobile, and the degree of pigment dispersion cannot be reversed. Abnormal clumping of melanosomes does occur in disease and may lead to irreversible changes in iris color (see heterochromia, below). Colors other than brown or black are due to selective reflection and absorption from the other stromal components. Sometimes, lipofuscin, a yellow "wear and tear" pigment, also enters into the visible eye color, especially in aged or diseased green eyes.

The optical mechanisms by which the nonpigmented stromal components influence eye color are complex, and many erroneous statements exist in the literature. Simple selective absorption and reflection by biological molecules (hemoglobin in the blood vessels, collagen in the vessel and stroma) is the most important element. Rayleigh scattering and Tyndall scattering, (which also happen in the sky) and diffraction also occur. Raman scattering, and constructive interference, as in the feathers of birds, do not contribute to the color of the eye, but interference phenomena are important in the brilliantly colored iris pigment cells (iridophores) in many animals. Interference effects can occur at both molecular and light-microscopic scales, and are often associated (in melanin-bearing cells) with quasicrystalline formations, which enhance the optical effects. Interference is recognised by characteristic dependence of color on the angle of view, as seen in eyespots of some butterfly wings, although the chemical components remain the same. White babies are usually born blue-eyed since no pigment is in the stroma, and their eyes appear blue due to scattering and selective absorption from the posterior epithelium. If melanin is deposited substantially, brown or black color is seen; if not, they will remain blue or gray.

All the contributing factors towards eye color and its variation are not fully understood. Autosomal recessive/dominant traits in iris color are inherent in other species, but coloration can follow a different pattern.

=== Different colors in the two eyes ===
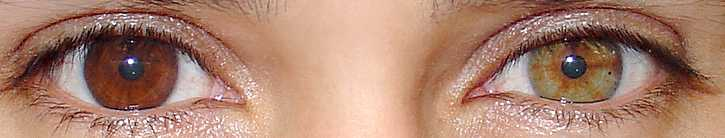
Example of heterochromia – one eye of the subject is brown, the other hazel.

Heterochromia (also known as a heterochromia iridis or heterochromia iridum) is an ocular condition in which one iris is a different color from the other iris (complete heterochromia), or where the part of one iris is a different color from the remainder (partial heterochromia or sectoral heterochromia). Uncommon in humans, it is often an indicator of ocular disease, such as chronic iritis or diffuse iris melanoma, but may also occur as a normal variant. Sectors or patches of strikingly different colors in the same iris are less common. Anastasius the First was dubbed dikoros (having two irises) for his patent heterochromia since his right iris had a darker color than the left one.

In contrast, heterochromia and variegated iris patterns are common in veterinary practice. Siberian Husky dogs show heterochromia, possibly analogous to the genetically determined Waardenburg syndrome of humans. Some white cat fancies (e.g., white Turkish Angora or white Turkish Van cats) may show striking heterochromia, with the most common pattern being one uniformly blue, the other copper, orange, yellow, or green. Striking variation within the same iris is also common in some animals, and is the norm in some species. Several herding breeds, particularly those with a blue merle coat color (such as Australian Shepherds and Border Collies) may show well-defined blue areas within a brown iris, as well as separate blue and darker eyes. Some horses (usually within the white, spotted, palomino, or cremello groups of breeds) may show amber, brown, white and blue all within the same eye, without any sign of eye disease.

One eye with a white or bluish-white iris is also known as a "walleye".

== Clinical significance ==
- Angle closure glaucoma
- Aniridia
- Anisocoria
- Horner's syndrome
- Iridocyclitis
- Iridoplegia
- Iritis
- Miosis/Mydriasis
- Synechia
- Third nerve palsy

== Alternative medicine ==
=== Iridology ===
Iridology (also known as iridodiagnosis) is an alternative medicine technique whose proponents believe that patterns, colors, and other characteristics of the iris can be examined to determine information about a patient's systemic health. Practitioners match their observations to "iris charts", which divide the iris into zones corresponding to specific parts of the human body. Iridologists see the eyes as "windows" into the body's state of health.

Iridology is not supported by quality research studies, and is considered pseudoscience.

== Graphics ==
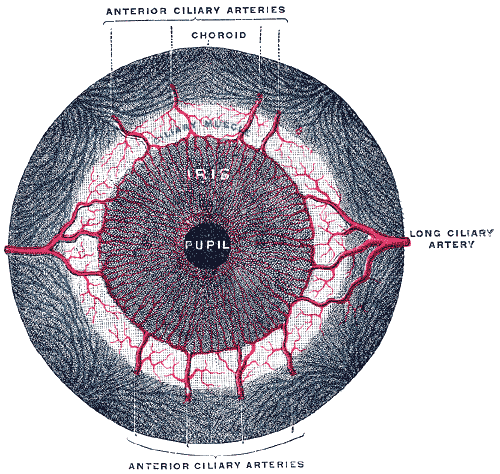
Iris, front view

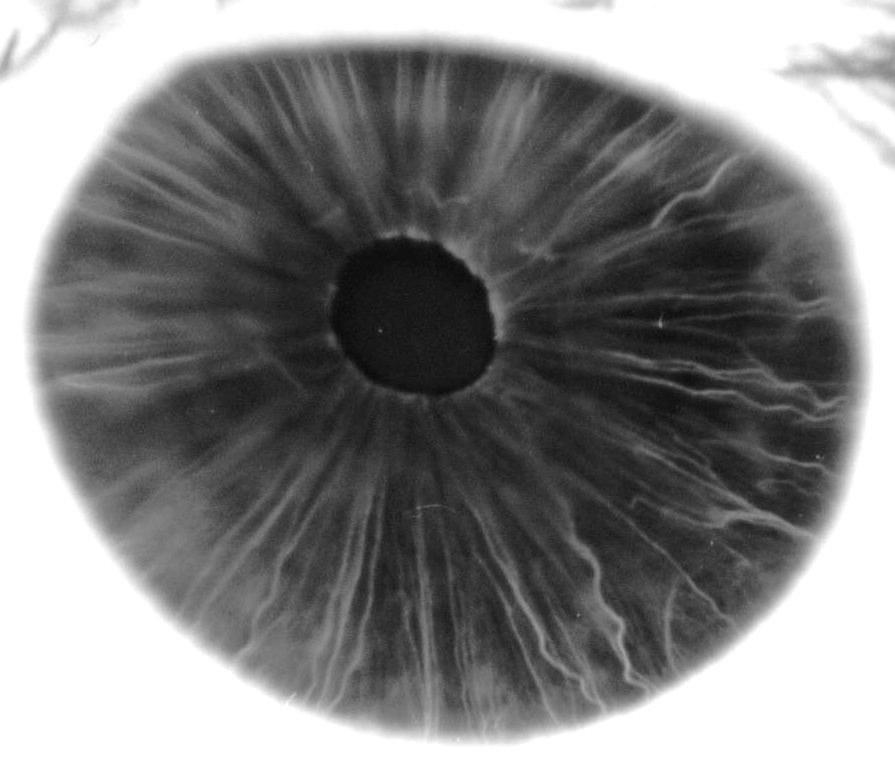
Fluorescein angiograpy of the iris reveals a radial layout of blood vessels.

== See also ==
- Blood–ocular barrier
- Coloboma
- Gonioscopy
- Human eye
- Iris recognition
