= Harlequin syndrome =

- Other names: Progressive isolated segmental anhidrosis
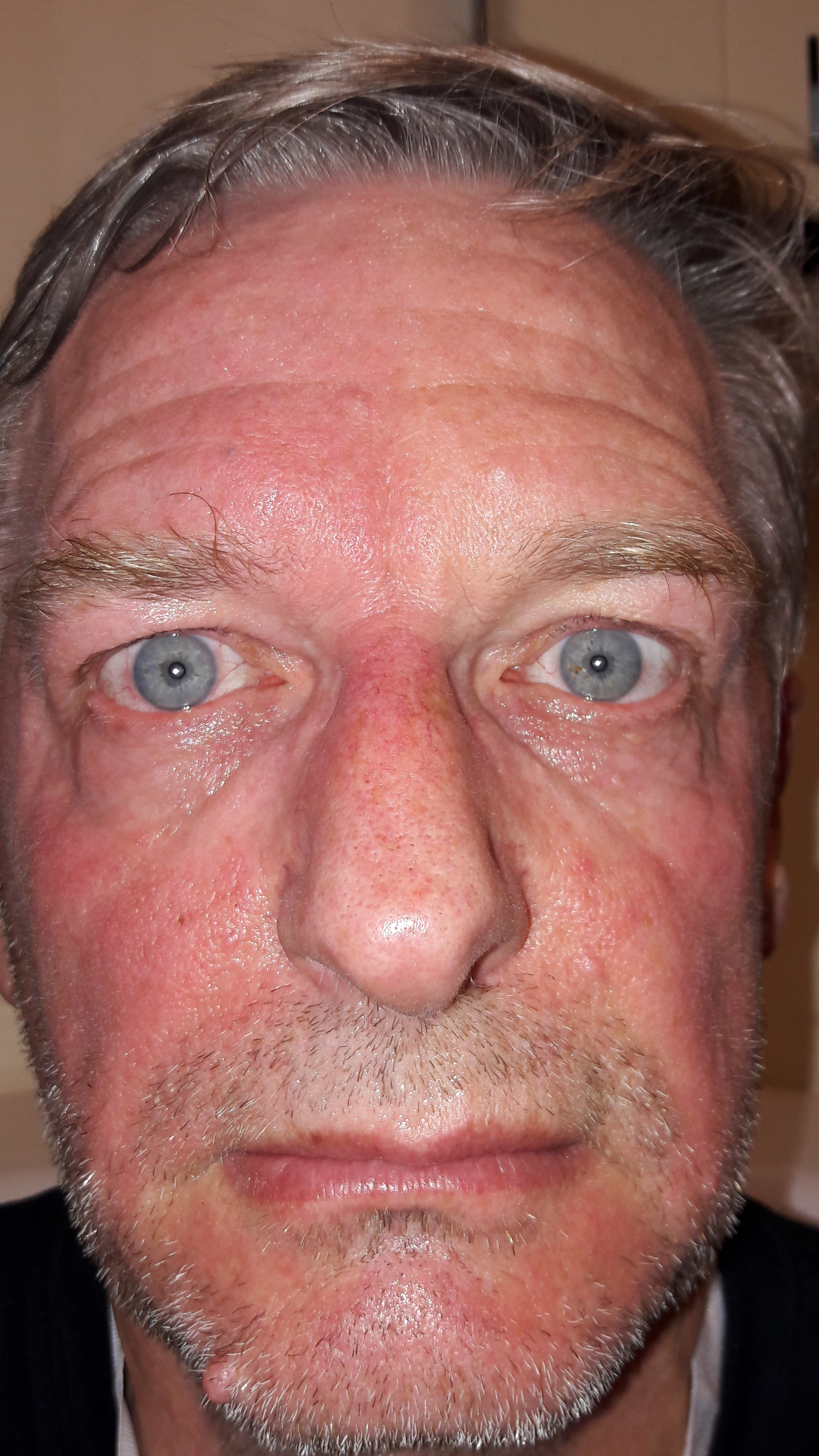
- A man exhibiting the asymmetric symptoms of Harlequin syndrome. One half of the forehead is more red than the other.

Harlequin syndrome, also known as "harlequin sign", is a condition characterized by asymmetric sweating and flushing on the upper thoracic region of the chest, neck and face. Harlequin syndrome is considered an injury to the autonomic nervous system (ANS). The ANS controls some of the body's natural processes such as sweating, skin flushing and pupil response to stimuli. Individuals with this syndrome have an absence of sweat skin flushing unilaterally, usually on one side of the face, arms and chest. It is an autonomic disorder that may occur at any age.

Symptoms associated with Harlequin syndrome are more likely to appear under the following conditions: vigorous exercise, warm environments and intense emotional situations. Since one side of the body sweats and flushes appropriately to the condition, the other side of the body will have an absence of such symptoms.

Harlequin syndrome can alternatively be the outcome of a one-sided endoscopic thoracic sympathectomy (ETS) or endoscopic sympathetic blockade (ESB) surgery. It can also be observed as a complication of veno-arterial extracorporeal membrane oxygenation (ECMO). This involves differential hypoxemia (low oxygen levels in the blood) of the upper body in comparison to the lower body.

== Signs and symptoms ==
The "Harlequin sign" is unilateral flushing and sweating of the face, neck, and upper chest usually after exposure to heat or strenuous exertion. Horner syndrome, another problem associated with the sympathetic nervous system, is often seen in conjunction with harlequin syndrome.

Since Harlequin syndrome is associated with a dysfunction in the autonomic nervous system, main symptoms of this dysfunction are in the following: Absence of sweat(anhidrosis) and flushing on one side of the face, neck, or upper thoracic area. In addition, other symptoms include cluster headaches, tearing of the eyes, nasal discharge, abnormal contraction of the pupils, weakness in neck muscles, and drooping of one side of the upper eyelid.

== Causes ==
One possible cause of Harlequin syndrome is a lesion to the preganglionic or postganglionic cervical sympathetic fibers and parasympathetic neurons of the ciliary ganglion. It is also believed that torsion (twisting) of the thoracic spine can cause blockage of the anterior radicular artery leading to Harlequin syndrome. The sympathetic deficit on the denervated side causes anhidrosis (lack of sweating). Patients with Horner's Syndrome may also experience this. The parasympathetic deficit on the denervated side causes the flushing of the opposite side to appear more pronounced. It is unclear whether or not the response of the undamaged side was normal or excessive, but it is believed that it could be a result of the body attempting to compensate for the damaged side and maintain homeostasis.

== Mechanism ==
Although the exact mechanism for Harlequin syndrome is still unclear, understanding what is affected with this syndrome is important. The majority of cases are thought to occur when nerve bundles in the head and neck are injured. Such bundles are able to send an action potential from the autonomic nervous system to the rest of the body. However, action potentials in this system are not being received by the second or third thoracic vertebrae which innervates the face, neck, and upper chest.

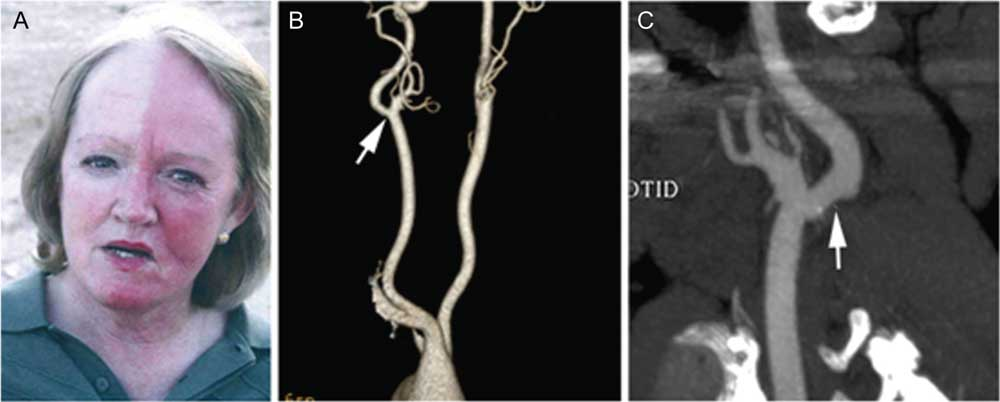
Harlequin syndrome, caused by a defect in sympathetic innervation

Damage or lesions near T2 or T3 could be between the stellate ganglion and superior cervical ganglion. This is where we would observe absence of sweat and skin flushing on one side of the face, neck, and upper chest.

== Diagnosis ==
Diagnosis of Harlequin syndrome is made when the individual has consistent signs and symptoms of the condition, therefore, it is made by clinical observation. In addition, a neurologist or primary care physician may require an MRI test to rule out similar disorders such as Horner's syndrome, Adie's syndrome, and Ross' syndrome. In an MRI, a radiologist may observe areas near brain or spinal cord for lesions, or any damage to the nerve endings. It is also important that the clinician rules out traumatic causes by performing autonomic function tests. Such tests includes the following: tilt table test, orthostatic blood pressure measurement, head-up test, valsalva maneuver, thermoregulatory sweat test, tendon reflex test, and electrocardiography (ECG). CT scan of the heart and lungs may also be performed to rule out a structural underlying lesion. The medical history of the individual should be carefully noted.

== Treatment and prognosis ==
Harlequin syndrome is not debilitating, so treatment is not normally necessary. In cases where the individual may feel socially embarrassed, contralateral sympathectomy may be considered, although compensatory flushing and sweating of other parts of the body may occur. In contralateral sympathectomy, the nerve bundles that cause the flushing in the face are interrupted. This procedure causes both sides of the face to no longer flush or sweat. Since symptoms of Harlequin syndrome do not typically impair a person's daily life, this treatment is only recommended if a person is very uncomfortable with the flushing and sweating associated with the syndrome.

== Epidemiology ==
Harlequin syndrome affects fewer than 1000 people in the United States of America. The frequency is reported as less than 1 in 1,000,000.

== Research ==
In August 2016, researchers at the Instituto de Assistência dos Servidores do Estado do Rio de Janeiro used botulinum toxin as a method to block the acetylcholine release from the presynaptic neurons. Although they have seen a reduction in one sided flushing, sweating still occurs.

There have been case studies of individuals who have experienced this syndrome after an operation. Two female patients with metastatic cancer, ages 37-years-old and 58-years-old, were scheduled for placement of an intrathecal pump drug delivery system. After the intrathecal pump was placed, certain medications were given to the patients. Once the medications were administered, both patients had one sided facial flushes, closely resembling Harlequin Syndrome. Patients were given neurological exams to confirm that their nerves were still intact. An MRI was performed and showed no significant evidence of bleeding or nerve compression. After close observation for 16 hours, symptoms of the Harlequin syndrome was diminished and both patients did not have another episode.

Another case study was based on a 6-year-old male visiting an outpatient setting for one sided flushes during or after physical activity or exposed to heat. Vitals, laboratory tests, and CT scans were normal. Along with the flushes, the right pupil was 1.5 mm in size, while the left pupil was 2.5 mm in size; however, no ptosis, miosis, or enophthalmos was noted. The patient also had an MRI scan to rule out any lesion near the brain or spinal cord. No abnormalities were noted and the patient did not receive any treatments. The patient was diagnosed with idiopathic Harlequin syndrome.

Although the mechanism is still unclear, the pathophysiology of this condition, close monitoring, and reassurance are vital factors for successful management.

== Eponym ==
The name for the syndrome is credited to Lance and Drummond who were inspired by resemblance patient's half-flushed faces bore to colorful Harlequin masks.

== See also ==
- Horner's syndrome
