= RAPD =

RAPD may refer to:

- Relative afferent pupillary defect
- Random amplification of polymorphic DNA
