= Robert Marcus Gunn =

Scottish ophthalmologist (1850–1909)

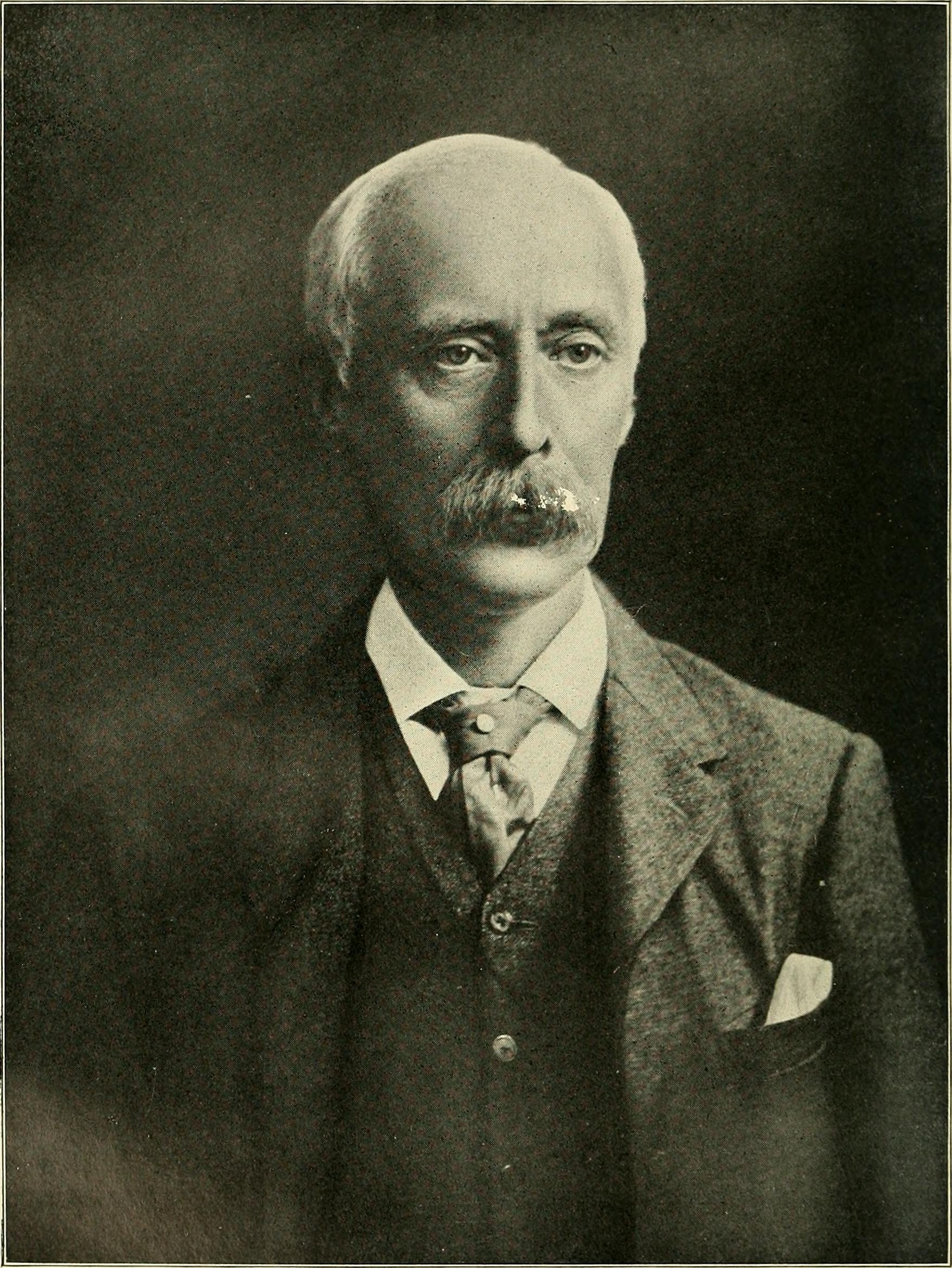
Robert Marcus Gunn

Robert Marcus Gunn (1850, Dunnet – 29 November 1909, Hindhead) was a Scottish ophthalmologist remembered for Gunn's sign and the Marcus Gunn pupil.

== Early life and education ==
Gunn went to school in Golspie, then studied medicine at the University of St Andrews and the University of Edinburgh, graduating with distinction M.A. in 1871 and M.B., C.M. in 1873. He was influenced by James Syme, Joseph Lister and Douglas Argyll Robertson during his studies. He taught himself direct ophthalmoscopy, a skill for which he would later become particularly noted.

== Career ==
Gunn was a house physician at Moorfields Eye Hospital and then worked in comparative anatomy at University College Hospital. He worked at the Perth District Asylum during the summers of 1874 and 1875, where he examined the fundi of all the patients. He spent 6 months in Vienna working under Eduard Jäger von Jaxtthal. He returned to Moorfields in 1875, becoming junior house surgeon and then senior house surgeon in 1876. He introduced Lister's sterile technique, improving the results of cataract surgery.

In December 1879, Gunn travelled to Australia to collect eye specimens from indigenous animals, publishing work on comparative anatomy of the eye in the Journal of Anatomy and Physiology. He also examined specimens from the Challenger expedition after his return to England.

Gunn became a Fellow of the Royal College of Surgeons in 1882 and became assistant surgeon at Moorfields in 1883 and surgeon in 1888. He was also appointed ophthalmic surgeon to the Hospital for Sick Children in 1883 and to the National Hospital for the Paralysed and Epileptic, Queen Square in 1886. In 1898 he was Vice-President of the Section of Ophthalmology of the British Medical Association, and was President of the section in 1906. He was President of the Ophthalmological Society in 1907, at which time he was senior surgeon at Moorfields. In this role, he introduced the systematic teaching of eye disease which had impressed him in Vienna previously.
