= Argyll Robertson pupil =

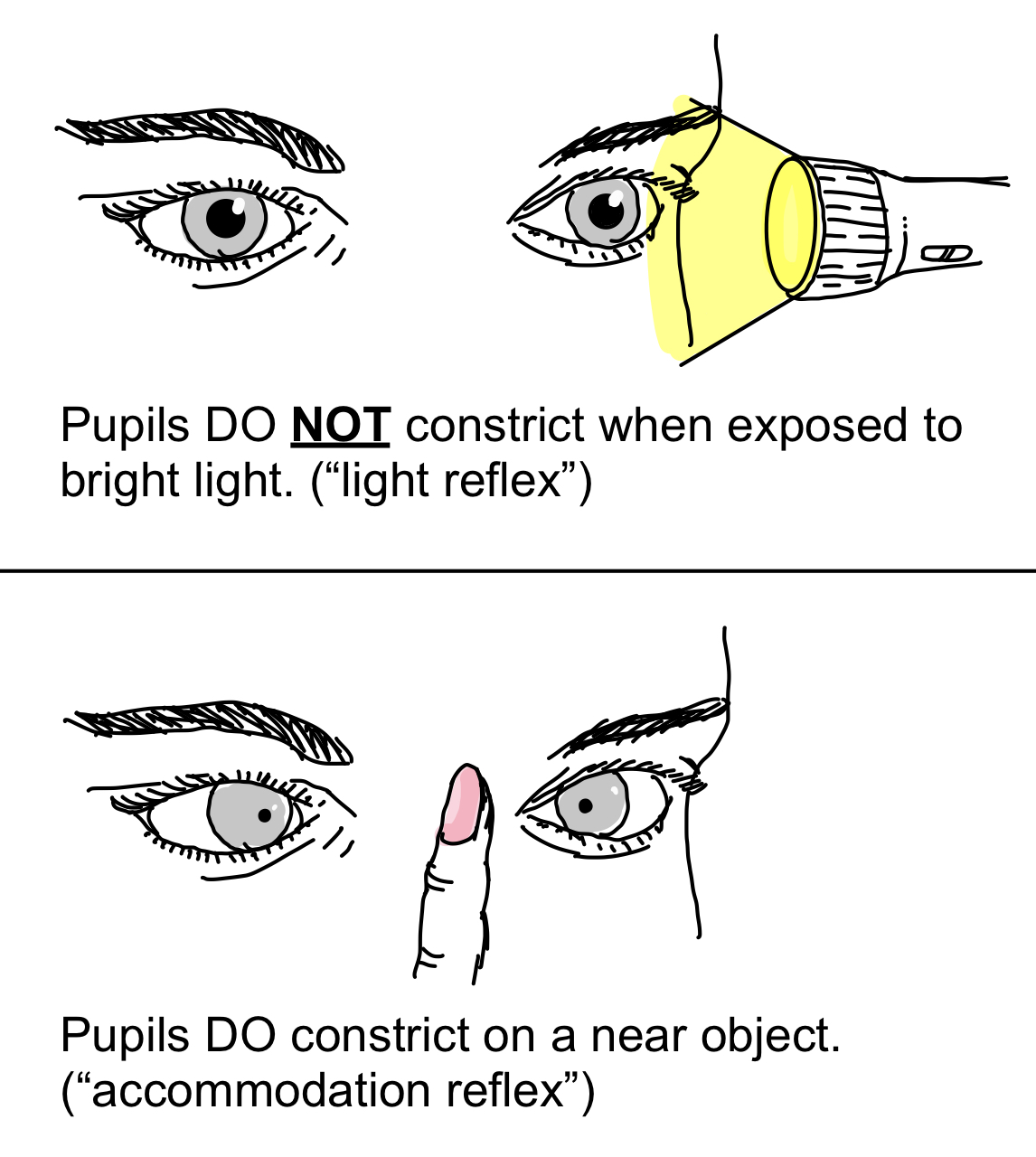
- Specialty: Neurology
- Risk factors: A highly specific sign of neurosyphilis
- Diagnostic method: Pupillary light reflex and accommodation reflex tests

Argyll Robertson pupils (AR pupils) are bilateral small pupils that reduce in size on a near object (i.e., they accommodate), but do not constrict when exposed to bright light (i.e., they do not react). They are a highly specific sign of neurosyphilis; however, Argyll Robertson pupils may also be a sign of diabetic neuropathy. In general, pupils that accommodate but do not react are said to show light-near dissociation (i.e., it is the absence of a miotic reaction to light, both direct and consensual, with the preservation of a miotic reaction to near stimulus (accommodation/convergence)).

AR pupils are extremely uncommon in the developed world. There is continued interest in the underlying pathophysiology, but the scarcity of cases makes ongoing research difficult.

== Pathophysiology ==
The two different types of near response are caused by different underlying disease processes. Adie's pupil is caused by damage to peripheral pathways to the pupil (parasympathetic neurons in the ciliary ganglion that cause pupillary constriction to bright light and with near vision). The pathophysiologic mechanism which produces an Argyll Robertson pupil is unclear, but is believed to be the result of bilateral damage to the pretectal nuclei in the midbrain. Studies have failed to demonstrate a focal localising lesion. Research has implicated the rostral midbrain in the vicinity of the cerebral aqueduct of the third ventricle as the most likely region of damage. A lesion in this area would involve efferent pupillary fibres on the dorsal aspect of the Edinger–Westphal nucleus (associated with the response to light) while sparing the fibres associated with the response to near, which lie slightly more ventrally. The exact relationship between syphilis and the two types of pupils (AR pupils and tonic pupils) is not known at the present time. The older literature on AR pupils did not report the details of pupillary constriction (brisk vs. tonic) that are necessary to distinguish AR pupils from tonic pupils. Tonic pupils can occur in neurosyphilis. It is not known whether neurosyphilis itself (infection by Treponema pallidum) can cause tonic pupils, or whether tonic pupils in syphilis simply reflect a coexisting peripheral neuropathy.

Thompson and Kardon summarize the present view:

The evidence supports a midbrain cause of the AR pupil, provided one follows Loewenfeld's definition of the AR pupil as small pupils that react very poorly to light and yet seem to retain a normal pupillary near response that is definitely not tonic.

To settle the question of whether the AR pupil is of central or peripheral origin, it will be necessary to perform iris transillumination (or a magnified slit-lamp examination) in a substantial number of patients who have a pupillary light-near dissociation (with and without tonicity of the near reaction), perhaps in many parts of the world.

=== Parinaud syndrome ===
A third cause of light-near dissociation is Parinaud syndrome, also called dorsal midbrain syndrome. This uncommon syndrome involves vertical gaze palsy associated with pupils that "accommodate but do not react." The causes of Parinaud syndrome include brain tumors (pinealomas), multiple sclerosis and brainstem infarction.

Due to the lack of detail in the older literature and the scarcity of AR pupils at the present time, it is not known whether syphilis can cause Parinaud syndrome. It is not known whether AR pupils are any different from the pupils seen in other dorsal midbrain lesions.

The condition is diagnosed clinically by a physician.

== Treatment ==
There is no definite treatment, but, because syphilis may be an underlying cause, it should be treated. However, because this sign is associated with neurosyphilis, it should be treated with crystalline penicillin 24 mU intravenous per day for 10 to 14 days. If the patient is allergic to penicillin, they should undergo desensitization and then be treated.

== History ==
Argyll Robertson pupils were named after Douglas Argyll Robertson (1837–1909), a Scottish ophthalmologist and surgeon who described the condition in the mid-1860s in the context of neurosyphilis.

In the early 20th century, William John Adie described a second type of pupil that could "accommodate but not react". Adie's tonic pupil is usually associated with a benign peripheral neuropathy (Adie syndrome), not with syphilis.

When penicillin became widely available in the 1940s, the prevalence of AR pupils (which develop only after decades of untreated infection) decreased dramatically. AR pupils are now quite rare. A patient whose pupil "accommodates but does not react" almost always has a tonic pupil, not an AR pupil.

In the 1950s, Loewenfeld distinguished between the two types of pupils by carefully observing the exact way in which the pupils constrict with near vision. The near response in AR pupils is brisk and immediate. The near response in tonic pupils is slow and prolonged.

== See also ==
- Adie syndrome
- Anisocoria
- Cycloplegia
- Marcus Gunn pupil
- Miosis
- Neurosyphilis
- Parinaud's syndrome
- Syphilis
