= William Walker (surgeon) =

Scottish surgeon (1813–1885)

William Walker (6 November 1813 – 16 August 1885) was a Scottish surgeon who specialised in ophthalmic surgery. He was Surgeon Oculist in Scotland to Queen Victoria and president of the Royal College of Surgeons of Edinburgh. He was a keen amateur photographer, whose calotypes were displayed in photography exhibitions.

== Early life ==
William Walker was born on 6 November 1813 in Dumfries, son of Margaret Walker (née Burnside) and William Walker, a Dumfries merchant. His mother was the daughter of Reverend William Burnside DD (1751–1806), minister of St Michael's Church, Dumfries and a friend of the poet Robert Burns. His father William Walker of Kelton Mains, Dumfriesshire, who had been a West Indies trader, died in November 1820 when his son was 7 years old. When his schooling was completed in Dumfries, his mother took the family to Edinburgh where they lived at first at 54 Northumberland Street in the New Town.

== Career ==
He studied medicine in Edinburgh, taking the Licentiate of the Royal College of Surgeons of Edinburgh qualification (LRCS) in 1836. He had attended the clinics conducted by John Argyll Robertson at the Edinburgh Eye Dispensary, the charitable institution at 405 Lawnmarket, and after qualifying he became associated with the Dispensary. By 1842 he was giving a course of twenty lectures on diseases of the eye at Surgeons' Hall as part of the Edinburgh Extramural School of Medicine. He qualified FRCSEd in 1851.

When John Argyll Robertson retired, Walker became the senior surgeon at the Edinburgh Eye Dispensary and in 1855 he was the first surgeon to be appointed to the ophthalmic surgery department of the Royal Infirmary of Edinburgh in Infirmary Street. Until that time several surgeons, including James Syme and John Argyll Robertson, had undertaken ophthalmic operations as there was no specialist department of ophthalmology.

In 1862 the Eye Dispensary, of which he was a trustee, moved from the Lawnmarket to purpose-built accommodation at 54 Lord Cockburn Street. In 1867 Douglas Argyll Robertson was appointed as assistant ophthalmic surgeon at the Royal Infirmary with Walker as his chief.

== Photography ==
Walker was a member of the Edinburgh Photographic Exchange Club and a founder member of the Photographic Society of Scotland. So too was his friend Thomas Keith, a fellow surgeon who was a gifted photographer and was his neighbour at 58 Northumberland Street. Walker experimented with photographic technique and equipment and in 1856 published his design for a portable camera. When processing calotypes he showed a surgeon's concern with both care in the manipulation of the paper and 'the strictest attention to cleanliness...' He believed that 'the best prints were obtained from an unwaxed negative as the...half tints were much more delicate.' He exhibited regularly at the Photographic Society of Scotland and in 1859 at the Aberdeen meeting of the British Association for the Advancement of Science. Walker was a member of the Edinburgh Botanical Society and at a time when plants still had an important role in medicine he took photographs of medicinal and uncommon plants. Such was the importance of photography in his life that when his presidential portrait was commissioned by the RCSEd, he elected to be portrayed with a photograph in his hand rather than the more usual surgical book or instrument.

== Honours ==
In 1870 after the death of William Mackenzie, he was appointed Surgeon Oculist in Scotland to Queen Victoria. Walker was elected President of the Royal College of Surgeons of Edinburgh for the years 1871-1872. In 1873 he was elected a member of the Harveian Society of Edinburgh. When the Ophthalmological Society (later the Royal College of Ophthalmologists) was founded by Sir William Bowman in 1880, Walker was elected vice president.

== Later life and death ==
Walker did not marry. He died at home in 47 Northumberland Street, Edinburgh on 16 August 1885.
