= Swinging light test =

Clinical test of pupil dilation in both eyes

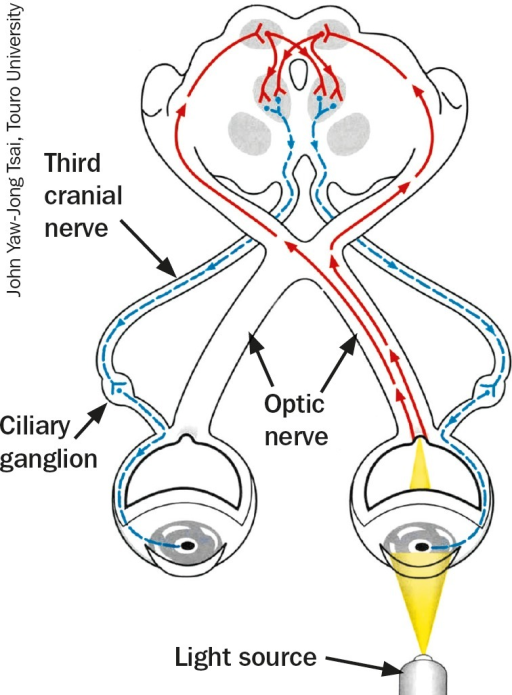
- When light enters one eye, it is detected by retinal photoreceptors and transmitted via the optic nerve to the pretectal nucleus in the midbrain. From there, signals are sent bilaterally to the Edinger-Westphal nuclei, which send parasympathetic fibers via the oculomotor nerves to the ciliary ganglia. These fibers innervate the sphincter pupillae muscles in both eyes, causing both pupils to constrict—the direct response in the stimulated eye and the consensual response in the other eye. This bilateral response ensures equal pupillary adjustment to light
- Specialty: Ophthalmology

The swinging-flashlight test, also known as the swinging light test, is used in medical examinations to identify a relative afferent pupillary defect.

== Process ==
For an adequate test, vision must not be entirely lost. In dim room light, the examiner notes the size of the pupils. The patient is asked to gaze into the distance, and the examiner swings the beam of a penlight back and forth from one pupil to the other, and observes the size of pupils and reaction in the eye that is lit.

== Interpretation ==
- Normally, each illuminated pupil promptly becomes constricted. The opposite pupil also constricts consensually.
- When ocular disease, such as cataract, impairs vision, the pupils respond normally.
- When the optic nerve is damaged, the sensory (afferent) stimulus sent to the midbrain is reduced. The pupil, responding less vigorously, dilates from its prior constricted state when the light is moved away from the unaffected eye and towards the affected eye. This response is a relative afferent pupillary defect (or Marcus Gunn pupil).

== See also ==
- Eye examination
