= Gordon Morgan Holmes =

Irish neurologist (1876–1965)

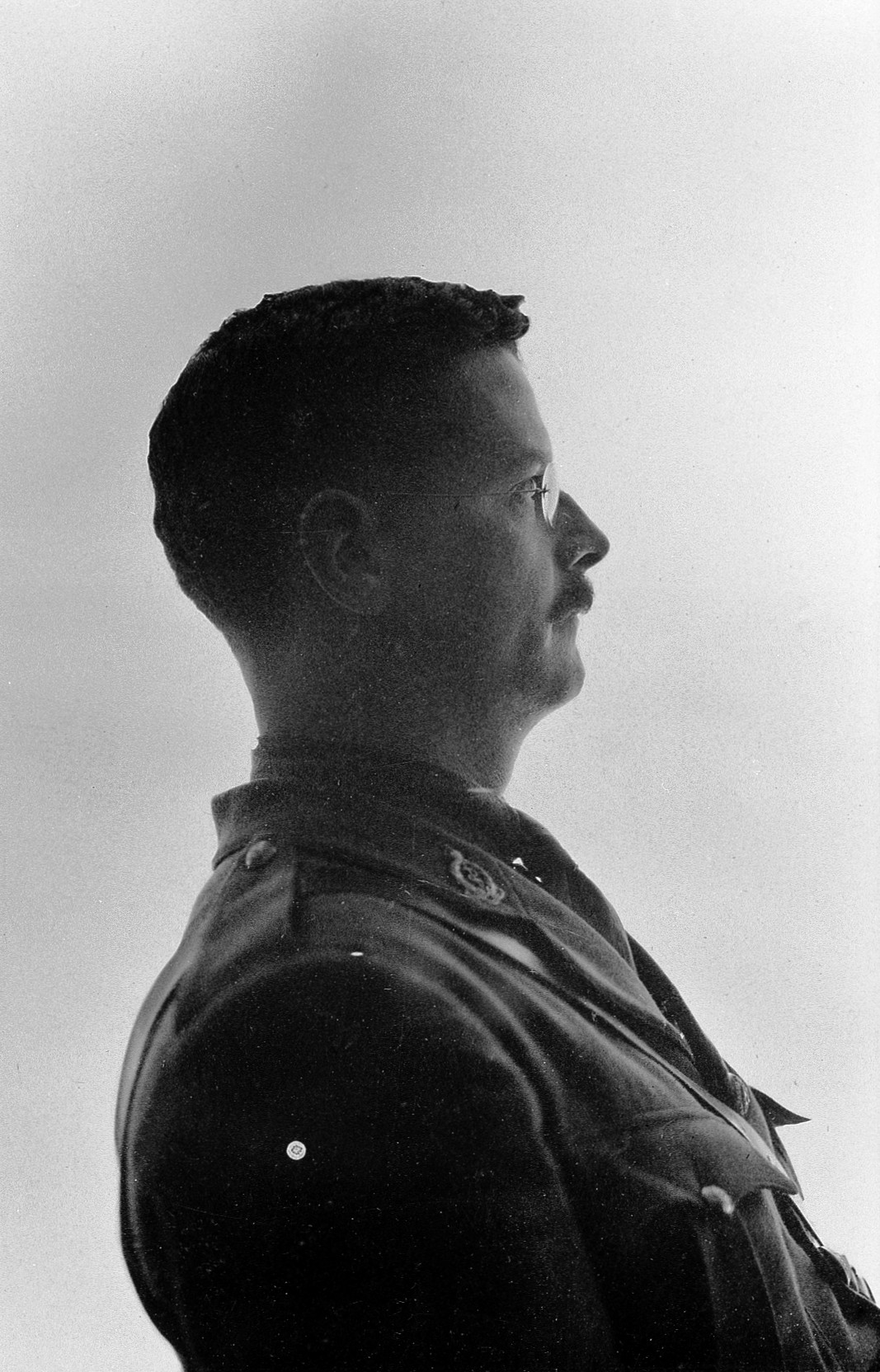
- Born: 22 February 1876; County Louth, Ireland
- Died: 29 December 1965 (aged 89); Farnham, England
- Education: Trinity College, Dublin
- Spouse: Rosalie Jobson
- Awards: Fellow of the Royal Society

Sir Gordon Morgan Holmes, CMG, CBE, FRS (22 February 1876 – 29 December 1965) was a British-Irish neurologist. He was best known for carrying out pioneering research into the cerebellum and the visual cortex.

== Education ==
The son of a County Louth farmer, Holmes was born 40 miles north of Dublin. He was educated at Dundalk Educational Institution (now Dundalk Grammar School) and Trinity College, Dublin, where he graduated in medicine in 1897. He then carried out research at the Anatomical Institute in Frankfurt.

== Career ==
He was initially employed at Richmond Lunatic Asylum and then, after working his way to New Zealand and back, returned to studying neurology in Germany. In 1906, he was appointed Physician to the National Hospital for Nervous Diseases, Queen Square, London.

At the outbreak of the First World War, he was appointed as consultant neurologist to the British Expeditionary Forces. Working in a field hospital he had a unique opportunity for the investigation of the effects of lesions in specific regions of the brain on balance, vision and bladder function. While in France, Holmes met his future wife, Dr Rosalie Jobson, an Oxford graduate and an international sportswoman, to whom he subsequently proposed marriage while rowing on the Thames. His wartime observations on gunshot wounds re-awakened his interest in cerebellar disease which led to his classical analysis of the symptoms of cerebellar lesions described in his Croonian Lectures to the Royal College of Physicians in 1922.

He was elected a Fellow of the Royal Society in May 1933. He delivered their Ferrier Lecture in 1944.

He was made CMG in 1917, CBE in 1919 and knighted in 1951.

== Biography ==
Gordon Morgan Holmes' father was a successful farmer at Dellin House, Castlebellingham, County Louth, about 40 miles north of Dublin. The early death of his mother, Kathleen (née Morgan), and his father's remarriage, deeply affected Holmes, and although he had three brothers and three sisters, he was a solitary child. Despite a transient dyslexia, Holmes was a brilliant scholar and after completing his education as a boarder at Dundalk Educational Institution, he entered Trinity College, Dublin, and graduated in medicine in 1897, at the age of 21 years.

Holmes was a resident at the Richmond Asylum, but soon after qualification he worked his passage to New Zealand, serving as ship's surgeon. Holmes then undertook 2 1/2 years postgraduate study in neurology in Germany. Initially he was in Berlin, but he said "it was all spoon feeding" and he went to Frankfurt am Main where he worked at the Senckenberg Institute with Ludwig Edinger (1855–1919) and Carl Weigert (1845–1904).

Edinger suggested that he investigated the experimental model of Friedrich Leopold Goltz (1834–1902), which was a dog who had had its brain extirpated, saying "I can't make anything of it!" It is possible that this experimental animal may have aroused his initial interest in the cerebellum. He said, "I might have become a German" for there was an effort to create a post for him in Frankfurt, but Ehrlich had just commenced his work on Salvarsan and it was decided that the money over the next two years go to that work.

Holmes therefore returned to London and became a resident medical officer at the National Hospital for Nervous Diseases in Queen Square, under John Hughlings Jackson (1835–1911), the doyen of British neurologists. Around this time, he published a paper detailing Holmes tremor and a phenomenon later known as the Holmes rebound phenomenon.

In 1906 Holmes was appointed as director of clinical research at Queen Square, where he commenced collaborating with Henry Head (1861–1940) in 1908. This led to the first accurate account of the functions of the optic thalamus and its relation to the cerebral cortex. The two men complemented one another because Head was imaginative and enthusiastic as well as speculative, whereas Holmes insisted upon attention to detail and would never bend facts to fit a hypothesis. At times this led to clashes between the two, but they continued a close collaboration until the outbreak of the First World War.

Holmes retained his urge for adventure and he sought a place on Captain Robert Falcon Scott's (1868–1912) ill-fated expedition to the South Pole. A ruptured Achilles tendon necessitated the abandonment of this plan and Holmes profited from his convalescence by obtaining a higher medical degree. In 1910, having obtained a higher medical degree, Holmes was appointed to the staff of the National Hospital when a senior colleague died suddenly. Thereafter his life revolved around his clinical and teaching activities in this hospital, which were unpaid, and a successful private practice.

Upon the outbreak of World War I Holmes was appointed as consultant neurologist to the British Expeditionary Forces. Working with his neurosurgical colleague Percy Sargent (1873–1933) in a field hospital they had set up, he had a unique opportunity for the investigation of the effects of lesions in specific regions of the brain on balance, vision and bladder function. While in France, Holmes met his future wife, Dr Rosalie Jobson, an Oxford graduate and an international sportswoman, to whom he subsequently proposed marriage while rowing on the Thames. They married in 1918 and went on to have three daughters.

Holmes' observations on gunshot wounds re-awakened his interest in cerebellar disease; this culminated in his classical analysis of the symptoms of cerebellar lesions which were published in his Croonian Lectures to the Royal College of Physicians in 1922, where he added more cases of gunshot wounds to his First World War experience as well as patients with cerebellar tumours.

When Holmes returned to the staff of the Charing Cross Hospital after World War I, he was joined by William Adie, a young Australian who became his friend. Holmes and Adie shared interests in neurology and neuroanatomy, and in 1941 they published separate papers on the condition. The condition now bears their conjoined eponym, Holmes-Adie syndrome.

In the period between the wars, Holmes had concurrent appointments at Queen Square, Moorfields Eye Hospital and the Charing Cross Hospital. He was an exceptional teacher of clinical neurology and his weekly case discussions at Queen Square attracted numerous postgraduates.

Holmes disliked medical politics and when forced to be on committees was said to vary between someone who was overwhelmingly bored to being forceful and bullying! He introduced to England the painstaking physical examination of a neurologist and even outstripped William Gowers in his systematic collection of clinical data and its correlation with anatomy and pathology.

He investigated amyotonia congenita with James Stanfield Collier (1870–1935) (Brain, London, 1909, 32: 269–284) and described the first removal of a suprarenal tumour (by Percy Sargent) reversing virilism in the patient. He was editor of the journal Brain from 1922 to 1937. He was well known for aiding young neurologists by going over their manuscripts and ruthlessly abbreviating and improving the English.

== Bibliography ==
- Studies in Neurology, 2 volumes. London, H. Frowde, Hodder & Stoughton, 1920 with William Halse Rivers (1864–1922), G. Holmes, James Sherren, Harold Theodore Thompson (1878–1935), George Riddoch (1888–1947):
- Introduction to Clinical Neurology. Edinburgh & London, E & S Livingstone Ltd., 1946
- G. Holmes, The National Hospital, Queen Square, 1860–1948. Edinburgh & London, E & S Livingstone Ltd., 1954
