= C. Lockhart Robertson =

Scottish asylum doctor and spiritualist from the 1800s

Charles Alexander Lockhart Robertson
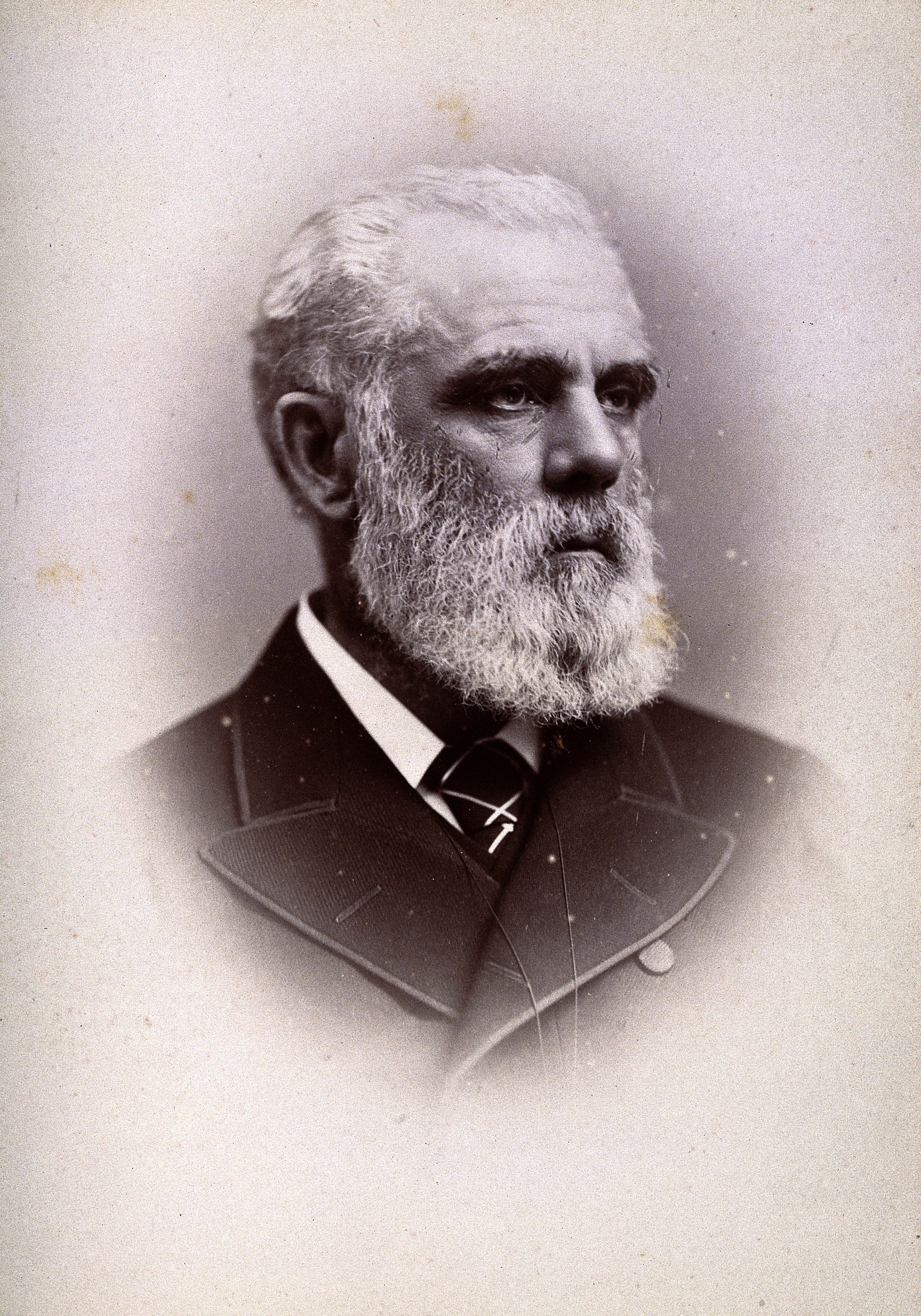
- Born: 4 April 1825
- Died: 18 May 1897 (aged 72)
- Occupations: Physician, spiritualist

Charles Alexander Lockhart Robertson (4 April 1825 – 18 May 1897), best known as C. Lockhart Robertson, was a Scottish asylum doctor and spiritualist.

He was born in Edinburgh, the son of John Argyll Robertson, president of the Royal College of Surgeons of Edinburgh. His younger brother, Douglas Argyll Robertson, became a distinguished ophthalmic surgeon. He studied medicine at Caius College, Cambridge, where he earned his M.D. in 1856. Lockhart Robertson worked as the superintendent of Sussex County Asylum at Haywards Heath from 1859 to 1870, and in 1860 he also served as Linacre demonstrator of Anatomy at Oxford University. In 1870, he was appointed Lord Chancellor's medical visitor and he held this position till 1896. He was the honorary secretary of the Medico-Psychological Association and edited the Journal of Mental Science. Lockhart Robertson's translation of Griesinger's Mental Pathology (undertaken in conjunction with James Rutherford) was a valuable addition to the professional literature. Robertson did not publish widely but his achievements with enlightened asylum administration attracted professional admiration across Europe.

Lockhart Robertson, originally a skeptic in the 1850s, became a convinced spiritualist in 1860 after attending a séance with the medium Daniel Dunglas Home. He was a founding member of the Society for Psychical Research. He died at Exmouth.

In 1884, aged 59, he married a minor, 19 year-old Mabel Wilton Rochfort, of Exmouth, daughter of Colonel Gustavus Cowper Rochfort, (dec'd 1884) late of the 41st Madras Native Infantry. They had two sons born in 1885 and 1890.

== Publications ==
- A Descriptive Notice of the Sussex Lunatic Asylum, Haywards Heath (1859)
- A Case of Homicidal Mania, Without Disorder of the Intellect (1860)
- The Care and Treatment of the Insane Poor (1867)
