= Relative afferent pupillary defect =

When one eye's exposure to light creates a muted pupil response in both eyes

- Other names: Marcus Gunn pupil
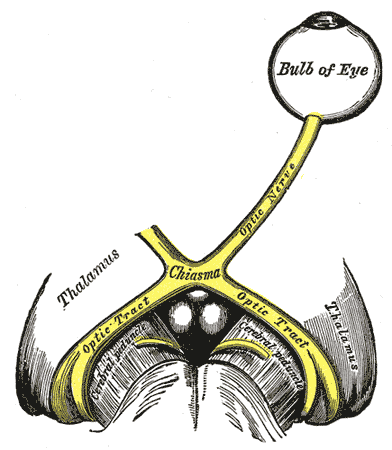
- The left optic nerve and the optic tracts. A Marcus Gunn pupil indicates an afferent defect, usually at the level of the retina or optic nerve. Moving a bright light from the unaffected eye to the affected eye would cause both eyes to dilate, because the ability to perceive the bright light is diminished.
- Specialty: Ophthalmology, Optometry

A relative afferent pupillary defect (RAPD), also known as a Marcus Gunn pupil (after Robert Marcus Gunn), is a medical sign observed during the swinging-flashlight test whereupon the patient's pupils excessively dilate when a bright light is swung from the unaffected eye to the affected eye. The affected eye still senses the light and produces pupillary sphincter constriction to some degree, albeit reduced.

Depending on severity, different symptoms may appear during the swinging flash light test:

Mild RAPD initially presents as a weak pupil constriction, after which dilation occurs.

When RAPD is moderate, pupil size initially remains same, after which it dilates.

When RAPD is severe, the pupil dilates quickly.

== Cause ==
Normally, the optic nerve is responsible for sensing light while the oculomotor nerve is responsible for contracting the pupil in response to this light.

The most common cause of Marcus Gunn pupil is a lesion of the optic nerve (between the retina and the optic chiasm) due to glaucoma, a severe retinal disease, or due to multiple sclerosis. It is named after Scottish ophthalmologist Robert Marcus Gunn. A second common cause of Marcus Gunn pupil is a contralateral optic tract lesion, due to the different contributions of the intact nasal and temporal hemifields.

== Diagnosis ==
The Marcus Gunn pupil is a relative afferent pupillary defect indicating a decreased pupillary response to light in the affected eye.

In the swinging flashlight test, a light is alternately shone into the left and right eyes. A normal response would be equal constriction of both pupils, regardless of which eye the light is directed at. This indicates an intact direct and consensual pupillary light reflex. When the test is performed in an eye with an afferent pupillary defect, light directed in the affected eye will cause only mild constriction of both pupils (due to decreased response to light from the afferent defect), while light in the unaffected eye will cause a normal constriction of both pupils (due to an intact efferent path, and an intact consensual pupillary reflex). Thus, light shone in the affected eye will produce less pupillary constriction than light shone in the unaffected eye.

Anisocoria is absent. A Marcus Gunn pupil is seen, among other conditions, in unilateral optic neuritis. It is also common in retrobulbar optic neuritis due to multiple sclerosis but unreliable in bilateral optic neuritis.

A total optic nerve (CN II) lesion, in which the affected eye perceives no light, is very similar to a Marcus Gunn pupil; to distinguish them, in a complete optic nerve lesion shining the light in the affected eye produces zero dilation nor constriction.

== See also ==
- Argyll Robertson pupil
- Adie syndrome
- Cycloplegia
- Miosis
- Parinaud's syndrome
- Syphilis
