= Douglas Argyll Robertson =

Scottish ophthalmologist (1837–1909)

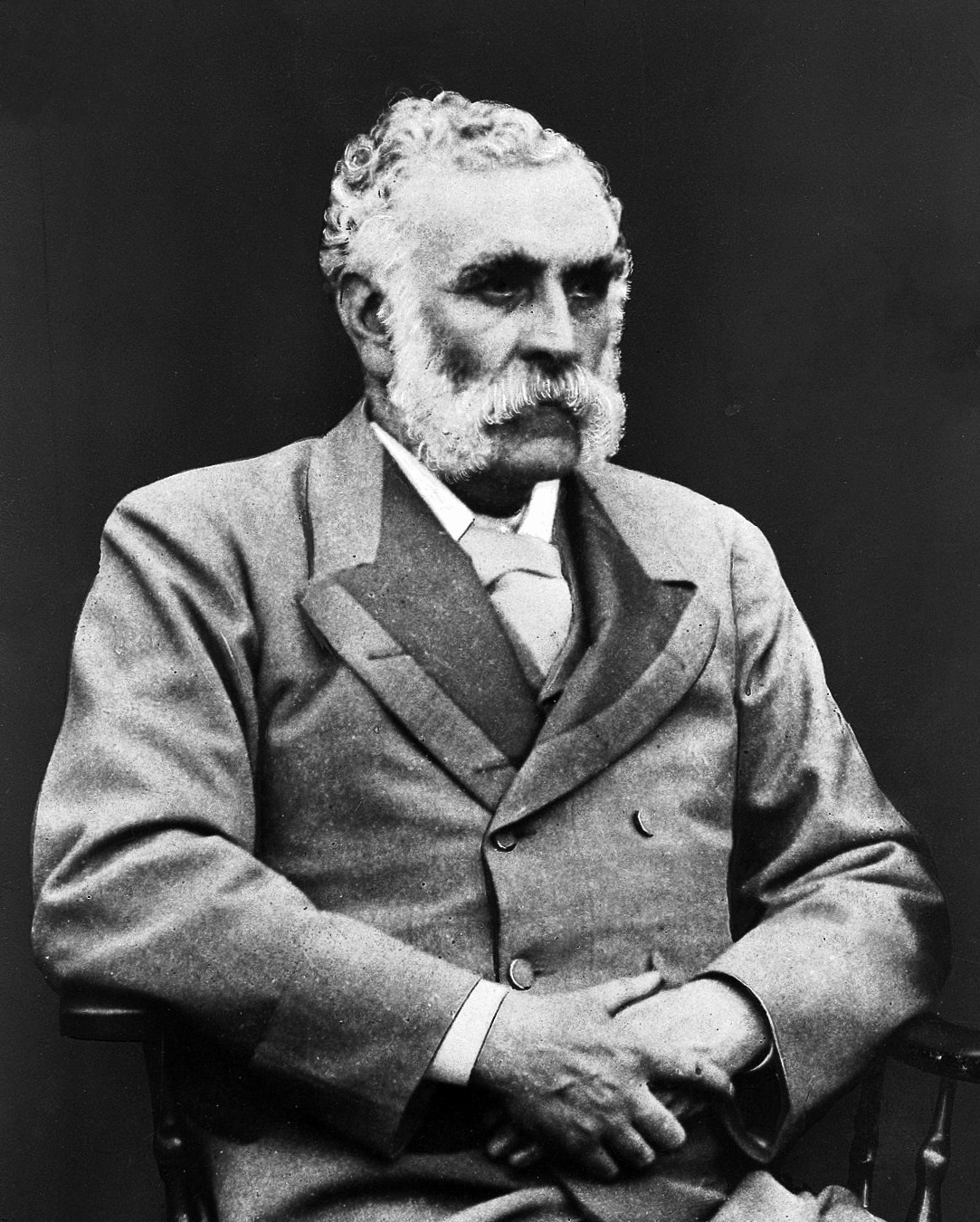
- Born: Douglas Argyll Robertson; 1837; Edinburgh, Scotland
- Died: 3 January 1909 (aged 71–72); Gondal, India
- Occupations: Ophthalmologist; Surgeon

Douglas Moray Cooper Lamb Argyll Robertson FRSE, FRCSEd LLD (1837 – 3 January 1909) was a Scottish ophthalmologist and surgeon. He introduced physostigmine into ophthalmic practice and the Argyll Robertson pupil is named after him. He was president of the Royal College of Surgeons of Edinburgh.

== Early life ==
He was born at 58 Queen Street in Edinburgh in 1837, the son of Dr John Argyll Robertson, a surgeon with an interest in surgery of the eye who had served as President of the Royal College of Surgeons of Edinburgh in 1846. His older brother, C. Lockhart Robertson was an eminent psychiatrist and Lord Chancellor's medical visitor. Argyll Robertson was educated at the Edinburgh Institution and at Neuwied in Germany going on to study medicine at the Universities of Edinburgh and St Andrews.

== Career ==
After graduating MD in 1857 from the University of St Andrews, he was appointed house surgeon at the Royal Infirmary of Edinburgh before going to Prague to study ophthalmology under Carl Ferdinand von Arlt (1812-1887) and then to Berlin to study under Albrecht von Graefe (1828–1870). On return to Edinburgh he became assistant to Professor John Hughes Bennett, Professor of the Institutes of Medicine (physiology) at Edinburgh University. He then joined the Eye Dispensary which his father had helped to found, and qualified as Fellow of the Royal College of Surgeons of Edinburgh in 1862. He then began to lecture on diseases of the eye in the Edinburgh Extramural School of Medicine at Surgeons' Hall. In 1867 he became assistant ophthalmic surgeon at Edinburgh Royal Infirmary under William Walker, and became senior surgeon in 1870 until he retired in 1897. He was lecturer on Diseases of the Eye in the University of Edinburgh.

== Effects of Calabar bean extract ==
Robertson made several contributions in the field of ophthalmology. The first was in 1863 when he researched the effects on the eye made by physostigmine, an extract from the Calabar bean (Physostigma venenosum), which is found in tropical Africa. Robert Christison, Professor of Materia Medica at Edinburgh University had in 1855 described the systemic effects of chewing a fragment of Calabar bean. It had used for judicial execution in Eastern Nigeria. Dr (later Sir) Thomas Richard Fraser, an Edinburgh physician, who had in 1862 been awarded the gold medal for his MD thesis on possible medical uses, drew Argyll Robertson's attention to its property of constricting the pupil of the eye. In the company of two colleagues Robertson instilled an extract of Calabar bean first in his left eye, and later at a higher concentration into both eyes. As a result of this experiment he recommended that an extract, which contained the active ingredient, the alkaloid physostigmine, be used to reverse the action of atropine, which had been used in fundoscopy to dilate the pupil since Helmholtz's introduction of the ophthalmoscope in 1851. This was the first miotic agent to be used in ophthalmic practice. He correctly predicted that physostigmine would become very important in the treatment of eye disorders and it was later used in the treatment of glaucoma with Ludwig Laqueur's discovery in 1875 that it could lower the intraocular pressure.

== Argyll Robertson pupil ==
He also described a symptom of neurosyphilis that affects the pupils of the eye, a condition subsequently known as Argyll Robertson pupil. In 1869 he published a paper giving the first description of unusual reactions of the pupils to light and accommodation in patients with tabes dorsalis (syphilis affecting the spinal cord). He describes small pupils which did not constrict response to stimulation with light but constricted normally during accommodation and convergence. The Argyll Robertson pupil became a pathognomonic sign for the diagnosis of syphilis affecting the central nervous system.

== Trephine operation for glaucoma ==
Argyll Robertson was the first to publish a description of and results following a trephine operation for the treatment of glaucoma. Creating a small hole in the sclera (anterior sclerotomy) to drain the aqueous humor, would, he reasoned, lower intraocular pressure. This principle still forms the basis for modern filtering surgical procedures for glaucoma.

== Sporting achievements ==
Argyll Robertson was a skilled golfer. He won the gold medal of The Royal and Ancient Golf Club of St Andrews on five occasions (1865,1870,1871, 1872 and 1873), and the Gold medal of the Honourable Company of Edinburgh Golfers in 1870, 1874 and 1876. It was said that his wife's favorite item of jewellery was a necklace fashioned from her husband's golfing medals. He was also a keen archer and, as a member of the Royal Company of Archers, the Royal bodyguard for Scotland, took part in their archery competitions.

== Honours ==
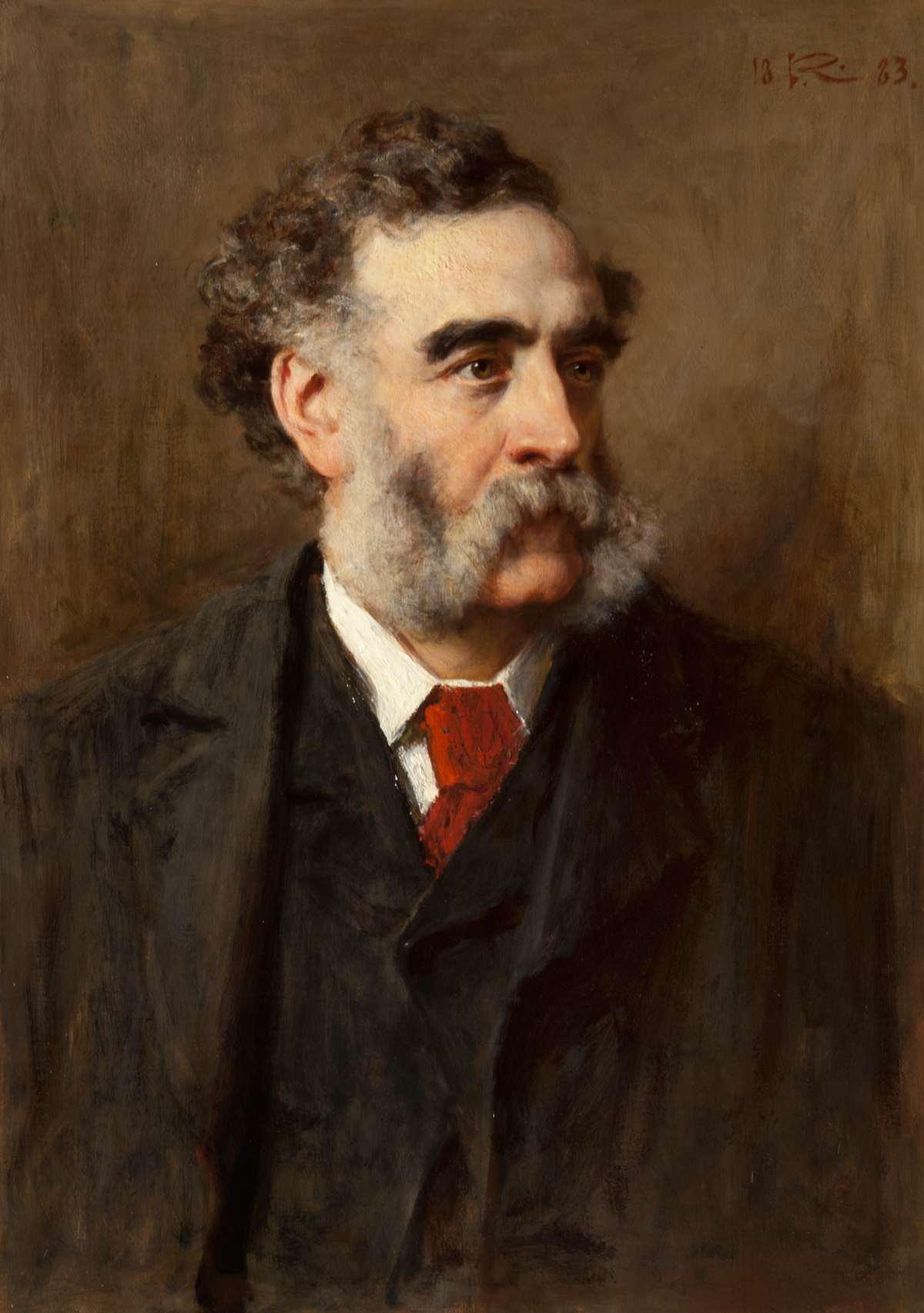
Douglas Argyll Robertson by George Reid

His honours included appointment as Surgeon Oculist in Scotland to Queen Victoria and subsequently to King Edward VII. In 1867 he was elected a member of the Harveian Society of Edinburgh. In 1872 he was elected a Fellow of the Royal Society of Edinburgh. His proposer was Peter Guthrie Tait. In 1878 he was elected a member of the Aesculapian Club.

He was President of the Ophthalmological Society of Great Britain from 1893 to 1895, and was President of the International Ophthalmological Congress when it met in Edinburgh in 1894. He was also President of the International Council of Ophthalmology and president of the section of ophthalmology of the British Medical Association. In addition, he was a member of the Ophthalmological Society of Heidelberg and a corresponding Fellow of the New York Academy of Medicine. He was awarded an honorary Doctorate of Laws by Edinburgh University in 1896 and was President of the Royal College of Surgeons of Edinburgh from 1886 to 1887.

== Family, later years and death ==
In 1882 Argyll Robertson married Carey Fraser, fourth daughter of William Nathaniel Fraser of Findrack and Tornaveen, Aberdeenshire. They had no children.

After retiring in 1904 he settled at Mon Plaisir, St Aubin, Jersey.

In 1892 and 1900 Argyll Robertson travelled to India to visit Bhagvat Singh, the Thakur of Gondal a former pupil at Edinburgh, who had become a personal friend. On a third visit in the winter of 1908–9 he died at Gondal, India, on 3 January 1909. He was cremated on the banks of the River Gondli. In an unusual gesture for a Maharaja, and as a token of the esteem in which he held Argyll Robertson, the Thakur sahib wore mourning robes and lit the funeral pyre of his guru and friend.

== Artistic recognition ==
His sketch portrait of 1884, by William Brassey Hole, shown arm-in-arm with Dr Thomas Clouston, is held by the Scottish National Portrait Gallery.

== Sources ==
- "Argyll Robertson". Doyne's Hall of Fame.
- Power, Sir D'Arcy. "Robertson, Douglas Moray Cooper Lamb Argyll (1837–1909)". Oxford Dictionary of National Biography (online ed.). Oxford University Press. doi:10.1093/ref:odnb/35778. (Subscription, Wikipedia Library access or UK public library membership required.)
