= John Henry Wishart =

- Born: 19 March 1781; Kirkliston, Scotland
- Died: 9 June 1834 (aged 53); Edinburgh, Scotland
- Education: Royal High School, Edinburgh
- Occupation: Surgeon
- Known for: Founding Edinburgh Eye Dispensary; President Royal College of Surgeons of Edinburgh
- Medical career
- Institutions: Royal Infirmary of Edinburgh; Edinburgh Eye Dispensary
- Sub-specialties: Ophthalmic surgery
- Notable works: Ophthalmia

John Henry Wishart FRCSEd FRSE (19 March 1781 – 9 June 1834) was a Scottish surgeon who worked at the Royal Infirmary of Edinburgh. Although a general surgeon, he developed a special interest in the diagnosis and treatment of eye disease. He translated into English three major works of the Italian anatomist and surgeon Antonio Scarpa. With John Argyll Robertson, Wishart jointly founded the Edinburgh Eye Dispensary. He was surgeon in Scotland to King George IV and served as President of the Royal College of Surgeons of Edinburgh from 1820 to 1822.

== Early life ==
Wishart was born near Kirkliston, West Lothian on 19 March 1781. His father, William Thomas Wishart (27 Feb 1746 – 1799) owned the estate of Foxhall, Kirkliston in West Lothian, Scotland (formerly known as Todshaugh). His mother was Ann Balfour (b 28 June 1743). Wishart's paternal grandfather and great-grandfather, both named William Wishart, were Principals of the University of Edinburgh. Wishart went to school at the Royal High School of Edinburgh where a fellow pupil was James Wardrop. who would become a lifelong friend and colleague. At school Wishart won the Murray Medal for Latin in 1795. In 1797, at the age of sixteen, he matriculated as a student at the University of Edinburgh to study medicine but, as was common at that time, did not graduate. He served a surgical apprenticeship with the Edinburgh surgical partnership of Benjamin Bell (1749–1806), James Russell (1754–1836) and Andrew Wardrop (died 1823). This was regarded at the time as the leading surgical practice in Scotland with a wide referral base.

== Career ==
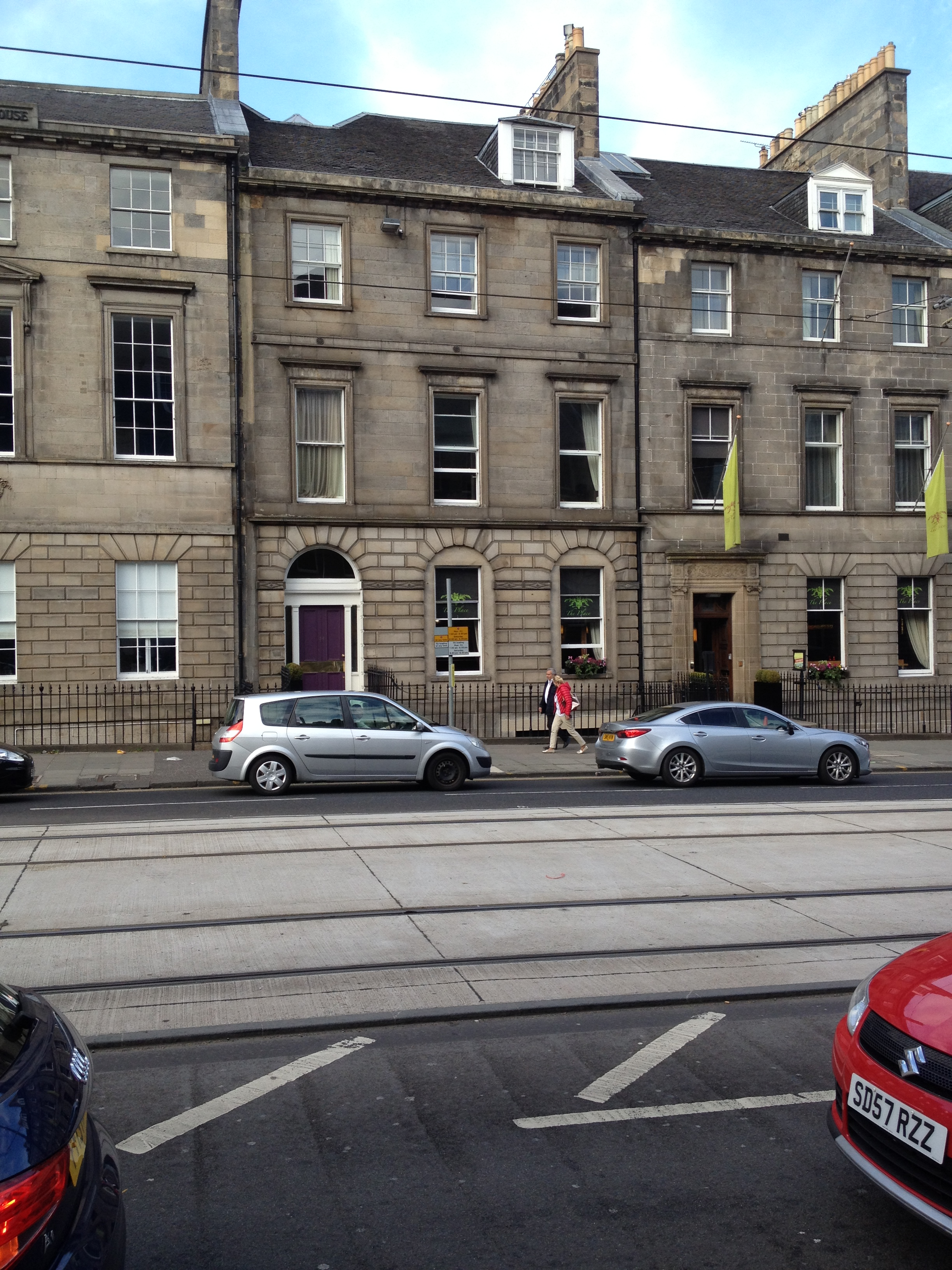
34 York Place in Edinburgh

In 1805 Wishart qualified as a Fellow of the Royal College of Surgeons of Edinburgh with a probationary essay entitled Ophthalmia., which he dedicated to Professor James Russell. In this he gave accounts of conditions which caused inflammation of the eye, such as conjunctivitis which had increased incidence, partly as a result of trachoma which had been introduced into the population of Britain by soldiers returning from Egypt and Spain during the Napoleonic Wars. Having decided to develop a special interest in ophthalmology, Wishart visited European centres to learn from some of the leading ophthalmic specialists. Accompanied by James Wardrop his friend from schooldays he studied under Georg Joseph Beer in Vienna. On his return to Edinburgh he set up practice at No 5 Nicolson Square. At this stage of his career he combined general surgery with ophthalmology. He translated into English two major works by the Italian anatomist and surgeon Antonio Scarpa, Wishart added his own notes and comments to the English edition of Scarpa's Treatise on Aneurism. He dedicated this to Professor John Thomson. He later translated Scarpa's Treatise on Hernia and dedicated this to his colleague James Wardrop.

He was appointed surgeon-in-ordinary to the Royal Infirmary of Edinburgh in 1803 and became assistant surgeon in 1818, acting surgeon in 1820 and consulting surgeon in 1824. He retired from the Infirmary staff in 1828. In addition to his Infirmary practice Wishart worked at the Public Dispensary in Richmond Street. In 1822 with his former apprentice John Argyll Robertson he founded the Edinburgh Eye Dispensary in the Lawnmarket. This was the first specialist eye hospital in Scotland, and served the sick poor as well as being a place for the teaching of medical students.

In 1807 Wishart was elected a member of the Harveian Society of Edinburgh and served as president in 1817. He was elected president of Royal College of Surgeons of Edinburgh in 1820. During his presidency John Barclay offered to the college his large collection of specimens on condition that a suitable building was obtained to house them. This resulted in the construction of the present College building in Nicolson Street, completed in 1832.

=== First description of type 2 neurofibromatosis ===
Wishart published widely on ophthalmic topics. In 1822 he published a Case of Tumours in the Skull, Dura Mater, and Brain. This is regarded as the first publication in English in which the clinical features and macroscopic post-mortem appearances of Type 2 neurofibromatosis are described. In this paper Wishart gives an account of a 21 year old individual who presented with increasing deafness affecting one then both ears. In addition he had a long-standing blindness in one eye. Examination showed a small palpable tumour on the occipital region. Over the next few months the symptoms worsened and the tumour grew in size. After consulting his physician colleague Dr John Abercrombie, who worked alongside him at the Royal Public dispensary, he dissected the tumour and established that it arose from the dura mater and was therefore not amenable to excision. The patient died two weeks later. At post mortem there were multiple small tumours arising from the dura mater and also from the cranial nerves. Tumours arose from the optic nerve accounting for the blindness and from both eighth cranial nerves accounting for the deafness.

=== Enucleation of the eye for tumour ===
He wrote one of the first accounts of a successful enucleation of the eye for tumour. In this work he describes the clinical features of an eye tumour in a nine-year-old boy. The enucleation was performed in four minutes and the patient 'bore the operation uncommonly well.' Wishart reported that the child was free of recurrence and symptom free eighteen months later. Wishart called the tumour fungus haematodes. From the features he describes (child with watery inflamed eye, unreactive pupil, cloudy white exudate in posterior chamber and lesion arising from the retina), it has been interpreted as representing a retinoblastoma, for which enucleation was, and remained the only treatment offering the prospect of a cure.

== Later life ==
Wishart continued to take an interest in other aspects of surgery and in 1818 he translated Scarpa's Memoir on the congenital club feet of children from the Italian.

In 1821 he was elected a Fellow of the Royal Society of Edinburgh. His proposer was James Russell.

He died at his home at the time, 34 York Place, on 9 June 1834. He is currently buried in Greyfriars Kirkyard in the sealed section known as the Covenanters Prison.

== Family ==
He married Louisa Melville Wilson (born 1790), daughter of Major James Wilson of the Royal Artillery. They had five daughters and three sons. Their second son, James Alexander Wishart (1822–1855) became a doctor, graduating MD from the University of Edinburgh in 1843 with a thesis on cataract. He is buried in the family grave in Greyfriars Kirkyard.

== Legacy ==
Wishart's name is given to one of the two forms of type 2 neurofibromatosis, the Wishart phenotype, which is seen in young people and characterised by multiple rapidly growing cerebral tumours.

== Selected publications ==
- A Probationary Surgical Essay on Ophthalmia (1805)
- A Treatise on Aneurism (an English translation of the work of Antonio Scarpa)
- A Treatise on Hernia (an English translation of the work of Antonio Scarpa)
- A memoir on the congenital club feet of children and on the mode of correcting that deformity (an English translation of the work of Antonio Scarpa)
