= Holmes rebound phenomenon =

Limb movement reflex

The Holmes rebound phenomenon is a reflex that occurs when one attempts to move a limb against resistance that is suddenly removed. When the resistance is removed, the limb will usually move a short distance in the original direction, at which point the antagonist muscles will contract, causing the muscle to yank back in the opposite direction. The phenomenon will be present in limbs unaffected by disease or illness, and strongly exaggerated in limbs exhibiting signs of spasticity. A complete absence of the phenomenon (that is, a failure of the antagonist muscles to contract) may indicate the presence of cerebellar disease. Therefore, an awareness of the phenomenon can assist in the diagnoses of both types of disorders.

The phenomenon was first described by Gordon Morgan Holmes and Thomas Grainger Stewart in a paper published in 1904, though it was not named until a 1917 paper published by Holmes.
