= William John Adie =

British physician and neurologist (1886–1935)

William John Adie MD Ed., FRCP (31 October 1886 – 17 March 1935) was an Australian-born British physician and neurologist known for describing the Adie syndrome and narcolepsy.

== Biography ==
William Adie was born in Geelong, Victoria, Australia, on 31 October 1886. He was educated at Flinders Street Model School, but had to leave school to support his family at the age of 13 when his father died in 1899. He worked as an office errand boy, and an employer noticed his ability to learn. He funded evening classes for Adie, who was able to pass the university entrance examination. A doctor in Geelong, Dr. Arthur South, inspired him to study medicine.

An uncle in Boston, Massachusetts paid £19 for a one-way ticket for Adie to travel to England to study medicine, which he did at the University of Edinburgh with the help of his uncle and a scholarship. He qualified M.B. Ch.B. in 1911. He became interested in neurology, and worked in Berlin, Vienna, Munich and Paris for a year on a travelling scholarship.

He fought in the First World War in France, firstly as medical officer to the Northamptonshire Regiment, and was one of few survivors from the regiment after the retreat from Mons due to a bout of measles which kept him from the battle. He was then posted to the Leicestershire Regiment, and was mentioned in despatches for saving a number of soldiers from a gas attack in 1916 by improvising a gas mask made of clothing soaked in urine. While on leave in 1916 he married Charlotte Patullo Bonar; they had two children. He subsequently served as neurological specialist to the 7th General Hospital, where he advised on management of head injured patients.

After the war he worked as a medical registrar at Charing Cross Hospital before working at the National Hospital for Nervous Diseases, Queens Square, and the Moorfields Eye Hospital in London, practising general medicine with neurology as his speciality. He became a Member of the Royal College of Physicians in 1919. In 1926 he was elected to the Fellowship of the Royal College of Physicians, and also received the gold medal for his M.D. at Edinburgh.

In 1932 Adie was one of the founders of the Association of British Neurologists, which was formed at a meeting on 28 July at the house of Gordon Holmes.

Adie was known as an excellent teacher of medicine and a fine diagnostician with extraordinary powers of observation. His interests also included ornithology, tennis and skiing. At the age of 45 he developed angina, forcing him to retire in 1935. He died on 17 March 1935 from a myocardial infarction at the age of 48.

== Publications ==
Adie and his colleague James Collier wrote the neurology chapter in Price's Textbook of the Practice of Medicine which is considered to be the first account of neurology in a general textbook.

Adie also published articles on pupillary abnormalities, "forced grasping and groping" in frontal lobe disorders, and narcolepsy.
