= Miosis =

Excessive constriction of the pupil

- Other names: Myosis, pinpoint pupil
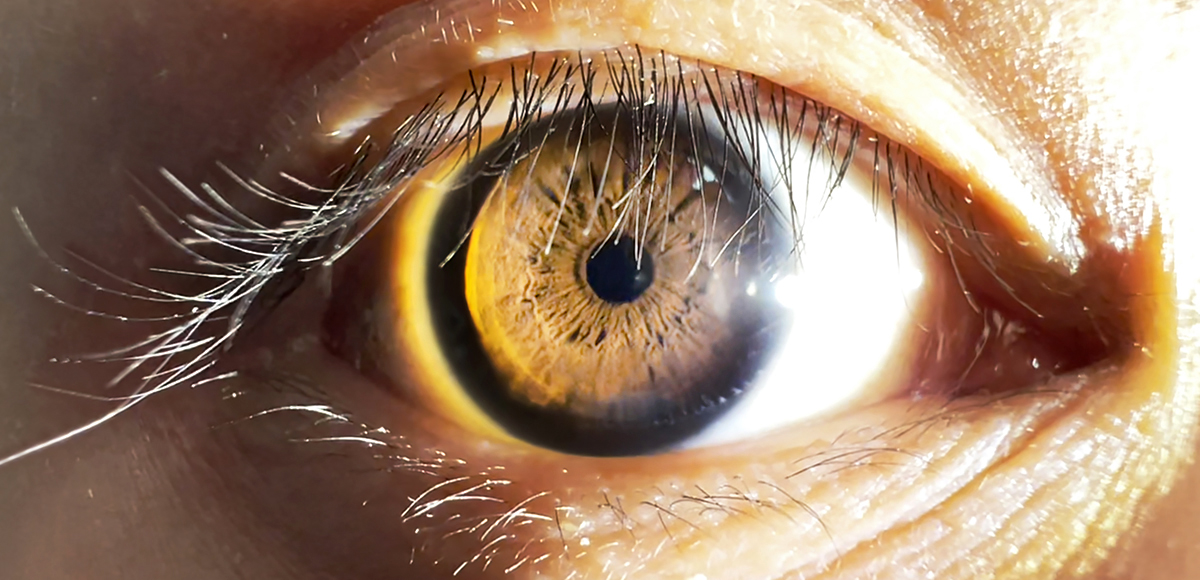
- Miosis from bright light pointed directly at the eye. Pupil measured 2.3 mm in diameter
- Pronunciation: /maɪˈoʊsɪs/
- Specialty: Ophthalmology
- Symptoms: Constricted pupils

Miosis, or myosis (from Ancient Greek μύειν (múein) 'to close the eyes'), is excessive constriction of the pupil. The opposite condition, mydriasis, is the dilation of the pupil. Anisocoria is the condition of one pupil being more dilated than the other.

== Causes ==
=== Age ===
- Senile miosis (a reduction in the size of a person's pupil in old age)

=== Diseases ===
- Ehlers–Danlos syndrome
- Horner's syndrome
- Hemorrhage into pons (intracranial hemorrhage)
- Hereditary disorders
- Cluster headaches with ptosis
- Iridocyclitis
- Fatal familial insomnia
- Aphakia
- Hemicrania continua

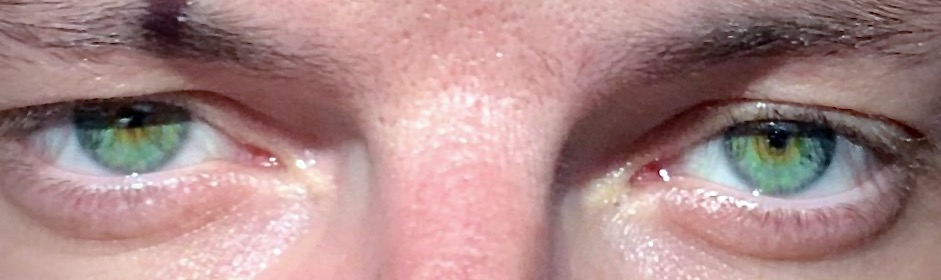
Miosis caused by high doses of opiates. The person also shows ptosis of both eyelids and an inattentive look at the camera, a sign of altered level of consciousness caused by the sedative effect of the drug.

=== Drugs ===
- Opioids such as fentanyl, morphine, heroin and methadone (the notable exception being pethidine)
- Products containing nicotine such as cigarettes, chewing tobacco or gum
- Imidazolines such as clonidine, naphazoline, oxymetazoline and tetrahydrozoline
- Antipsychotics, including risperidone, haloperidol, chlorpromazine, olanzapine, quetiapine
- Cholinergic agents such as acetylcholine
- Acetylcholinesterase inhibitors
- Serotonin antagonists, such as ondansetron (an anti-emetic) known by its brand name Zofran/ Emiston in BD
- Some cancer chemotherapy drugs, including camptothecin derivatives
- Mirtazapine, a noradrenergic and specific serotonergic antidepressant (NaSSA)
- Some MAO inhibitors
- Pilocarpine eye drops and all other parasympathomimetics
- In some rare cases, when exposed to mustard gas
- Organophosphates

== Physiology of the photomotor reflex ==
Light entering the eye strikes three different photoreceptors in the retina: the familiar rods and cones used in image forming and the more newly discovered photosensitive ganglion cells. The ganglion cells give information about ambient light levels, and react sluggishly compared to the rods and cones. Signals from photosensitive ganglion cells have multiple functions including acute suppression of the hormone melatonin, entrainment of the body's circadian rhythms and regulation of the size of the pupil.

The retinal photoceptors convert light stimuli into electric impulses. Nerves involved in the resizing of the pupil connect to the pretectal nucleus of the high midbrain, bypassing the lateral geniculate nucleus and the primary visual cortex. From the pretectal nucleus neurons send axons to neurons of the Edinger–Westphal nucleus whose visceromotor axons run along both the left and right oculomotor nerves. Visceromotor nerve axons (which constitute a portion of cranial nerve III, along with the somatomotor portion derived from the Edinger-Westphal nucleus) synapse on ciliary ganglion neurons, whose parasympathetic axons innervate the iris sphincter muscle, producing miosis.

== See also ==
- Adie syndrome
- Argyll Robertson pupil
- Cycloplegia
- Glaucoma
- Marcus Gunn pupil
- Parinaud's syndrome
- Pupillary light reflex
- Syphilis
