= John Argyll Robertson =

Scottish surgeon

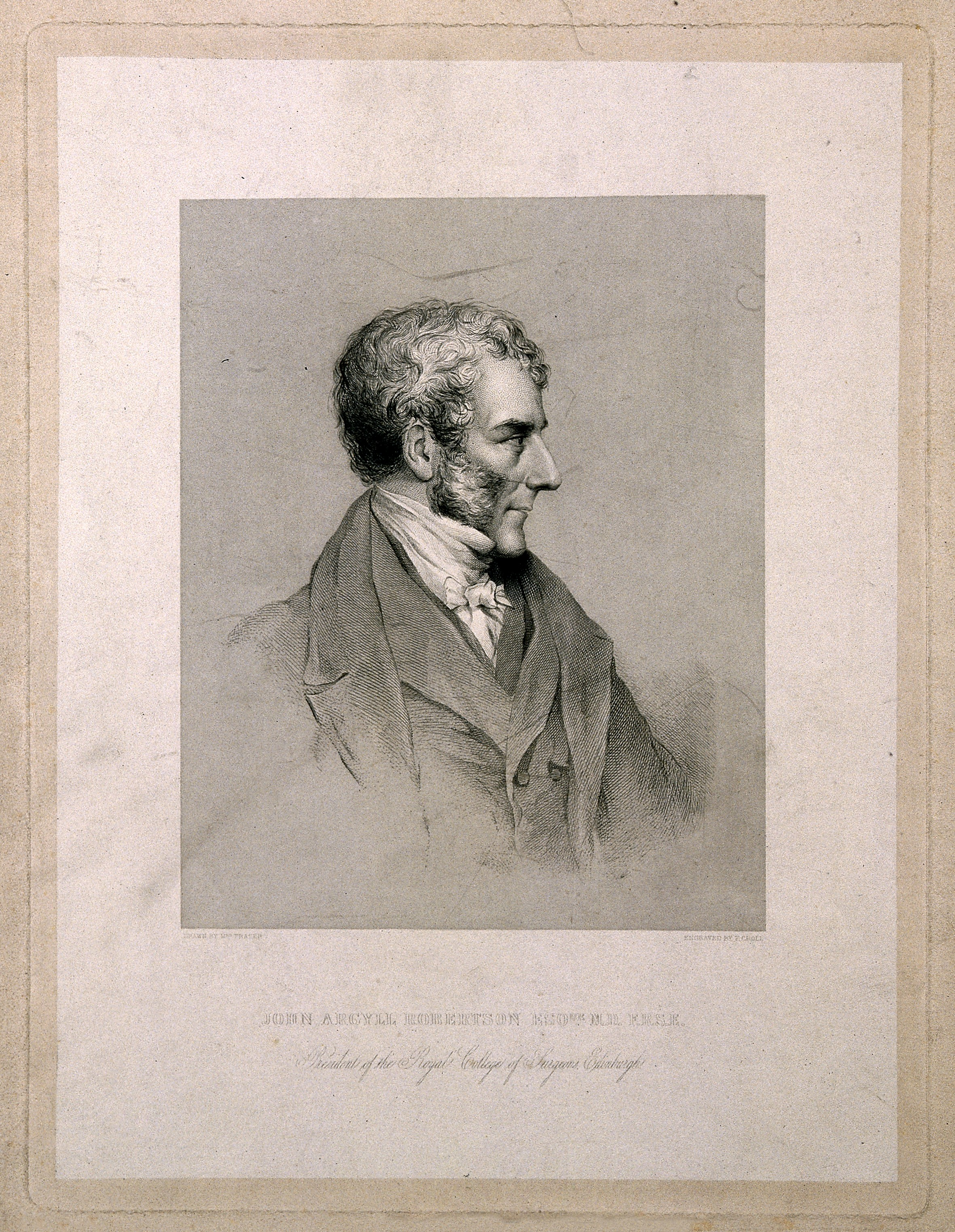
John Argyll Robertson (1800–1855). Lithograph after F. Croll after Mrs Fraser.

Dr John Argyll Robertson FRSE PRCSE (12 August 1800 – 7 January 1855) was a Scottish surgeon who specialised in ophthalmic surgery and became President of the Royal College of Surgeons of Edinburgh in 1848.

== Early life ==
John Argyll Robertson was born on 12 August 1800, the son of Alexander Robertson of Prenderguest, Ayton, Berwickshire and his wife Philadelphia Robertson (née Lamb). He was apprenticed to John Henry Wishart, a surgeon with an interest in eye conditions at Edinburgh Royal Infirmary. Like his two older brothers Robert and William, he studied medicine at Edinburgh University Medical School. In his degree thesis entitled "Ophthalmia" he described inflammation of the anterior chamber of the eye, suggesting causes and possible treatment options. The thesis is dedicated to John Wishart, his surgical master, who was President of the Royal College of Surgeons of Edinburgh in 1820. Robertson qualified MD in 1819.

== Surgical career ==
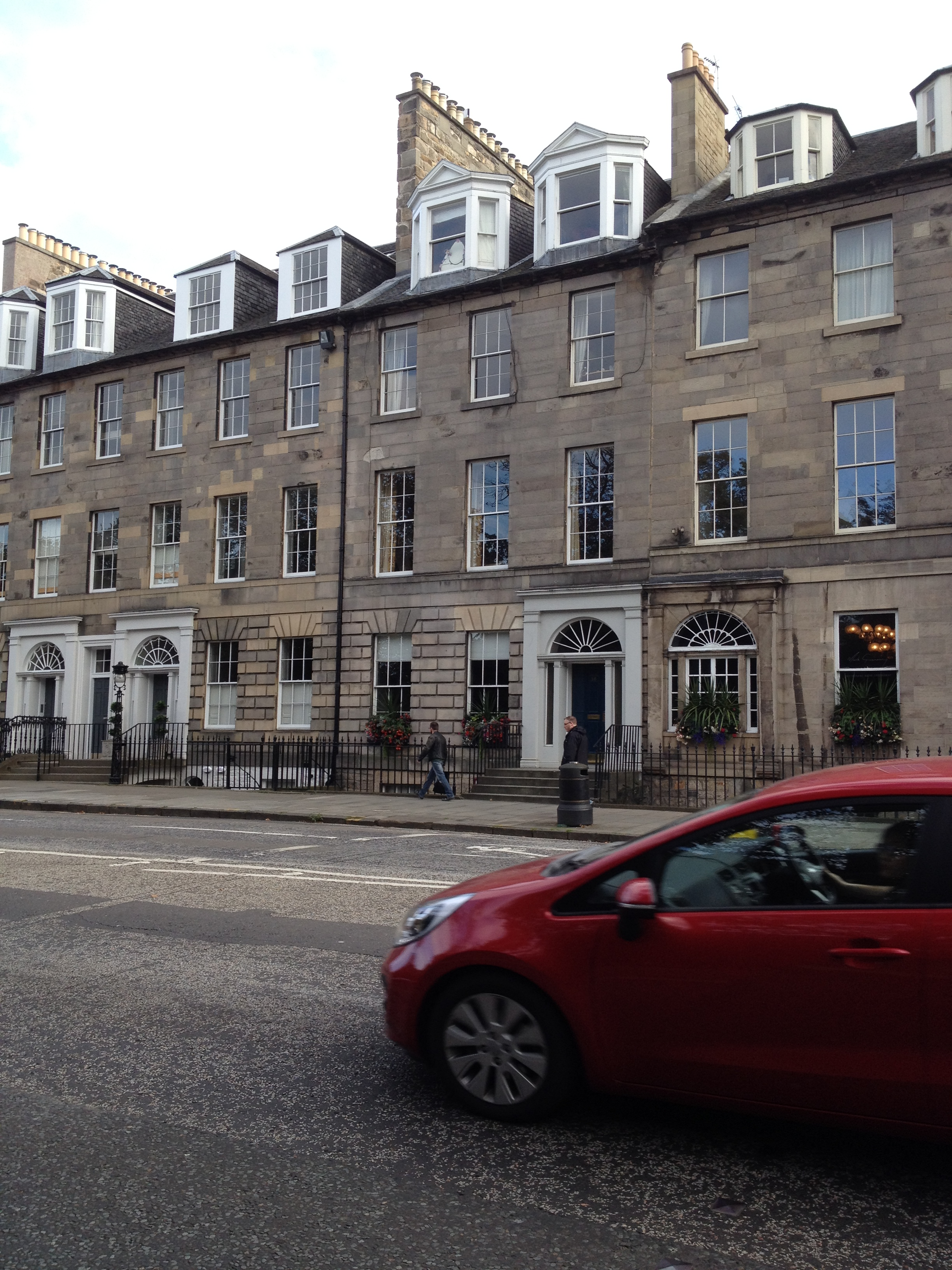
58 Queen Street, Edinburgh

After qualifying he spent two years in Paris gaining further experience, followed by a year of study at German and Italian medical centres. In 1821 Roberson submitted his probationary essay, entitled "On the Anatomy and Physiology of the Eye", to become a Fellow of the Royal College of Surgeons of Edinburgh (FRCSEd). In this he makes the observation that the physiological blind spot in the eye corresponds to the optic disc. He was elected FRCSEd on 26 February 1822. Later that year he set up in practice in Edinburgh and, along with John Henry Wishart, he founded the Edinburgh Eye Dispensary, the first specialist ophthalmic hospital in Scotland, with premises in the Lawnmarket, Edinburgh.

In 1825 he began to give lectures in the Edinburgh Extra Mural Medical School and in 1832 applied for the Chair of Materia Medica at the University of Edinburgh, but was not successful. In 1827 he was elected a member of the Aesculapian Club. In 1838 he was appointed general and ophthalmic surgeon to the Surgical Department of the Royal Infirmary, a post he held till 1842.

At this time he lived at 58 Queen Street in Edinburgh.

His publications included Observations on the extraction and displacement of the cataract, in which he reviewed the literature on the surgical treatment of cataract. This was considered to be the first statistical account of the results of cataract surgery. He was elected President of the Royal College of Surgeons of Edinburgh in 1848, but retired after only one year in office being succeeded by James Syme.

== Later years and death ==
He retired to Rose Park in St Andrews. John Argyll Robertson died there on 7 January 1855 aged 54 years.

== Family ==
His brothers Robert and William Robertson both graduated MD from Edinburgh University, both obtained the FRCSEd and became surgeons.

On 3 July 1824 he married Anne Lockhart and, after her death, he married, on 12 May 1829, Elizabeth Wightman. His elder son Charles, best known as C. Lockhart Robertson became an asylum doctor and Lord Chancellor's Visitor for Asylums, whilst his younger son, Douglas Argyll Robertson, achieved eminence as an ophthalmic surgeon and, like his father, was president of the Royal College of Surgeons of Edinburgh.

Robertson was awarded compensation for slaves owned in three separate plantations in Tobago following the Slave Compensation Act 1837.
