= Ross' syndrome =

Symptoms of Adie syndrome plus segmental anhidrosis

- Specialty: Dermatology

Ross' syndrome consists of Adie's syndrome (myotonic pupils and absent deep tendon reflexes) plus segmental anhidrosis (typically associated with compensatory hyperhidrosis).

It was characterized in 1958 by A. T. Ross.

By 1992, eighteen cases had been documented.

== Signs and symptoms ==
Initial manifestations often include an abnormal segmental sweating response (described as hyperhidrosis or anhidrosis in some patients) and a tonic pupil. Other commonly reported symptoms included fatigue, chronic cough, and increased urinary frequency.

== Prognosis ==
Ross syndrome is a non life-threatening benign condition but delay in diagnosis can result in slow progression of autonomic symptoms.

== Epidemiology ==
Ross Syndrome is a progressive autonomic dysfunction that can occur in any age, ethnicity, or gender. The average age of diagnosis for Ross syndrome is 36 years and affects more females than males.

== See also ==
- Hypohidrosis
- List of cutaneous conditions
