= Adie syndrome =

Neurological disorder

Adie's syndrome
- Other names: Holmes–Adie syndrome, Adie's tonic pupil, Holmes–Adie pupil
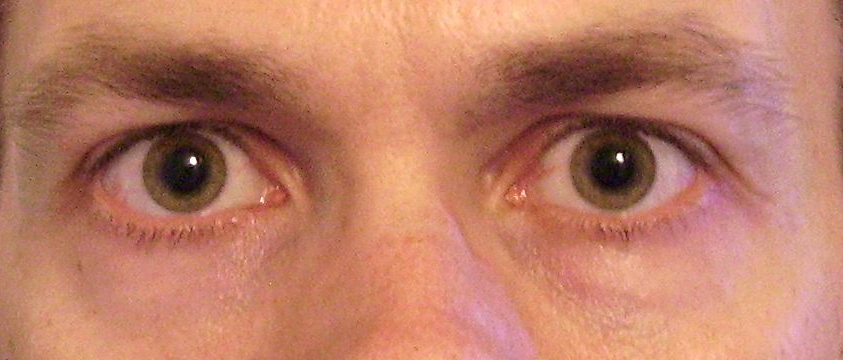
- Bilateral mydriasis given the observational diagnosis Adie's pupils by an ophthalmologist
- Pronunciation: /ˈeɪdi/
- Specialty: Ophthalmology

Adie syndrome, also known as Holmes–Adie syndrome, is a neurological disorder characterized by a tonically dilated pupil that reacts slowly to light but shows a more definite response to accommodation (i.e., light-near dissociation). It most often affects young to middle-aged women. The tonic pupil may occur alone (Adie tonic pupil) or with reduced or absent deep tendon reflexes (Adie syndrome), and sometimes with segmental loss of sweating.

The syndrome is caused by damage to the postganglionic fibers of the parasympathetic innervation of the eye, such as by infections, autoimmune diseases, or paraneoplastic conditions, and affects the pupil of the eye and the autonomic nervous system. It is named after the British neurologists William John Adie and Gordon Morgan Holmes, who independently described the same disease in 1931.

== Signs and symptoms ==
Adie syndrome presents with three hallmark symptoms, namely at least one abnormally dilated pupil (mydriasis) which does not constrict in response to light, loss of deep tendon reflexes, and abnormalities of sweating. Other signs may include hyperopia due to accommodative paresis, photophobia and difficulty reading. Some individuals with Adie syndrome may also have cardiovascular abnormalities.

== Pathophysiology ==
Pupillary signs result from loss of ciliary ganglion neurons, which control parasympathetic pupillary constriction, followed by aberrant reinnervation. Initial causes of damage to ciliary ganglion neurons may include herpes zoster or herpes simplex infection, syphilis, autoimmune disease, or paraneoplastic syndromes. Accommodative fibers greatly outnumber pupillomotor fibers, and regenerating fibers mostly reinnervate the iris sphincter from accommodative pathways. This produces light–near dissociation, which develops over months. However, in the acute phase, both the light and near responses are impaired.

Additionally, patients with Adie Syndrome can also experience problems with autonomic control of the body. Areflexia is attributed to involvement of the dorsal root ganglia. Some researchers place Adie syndrome, Ross syndrome, and harlequin syndrome on a spectrum of injury to autonomic and dorsal root ganglia. Adie pupil is supersensitive to acetylcholine, so a muscarinic agonist (e.g. pilocarpine) whose dose would not be able to cause pupillary constriction in a normal patient would cause it in a patient with Adie Syndrome.

== Diagnosis ==
Clinical exam may reveal sectoral paresis of the iris sphincter or vermiform iris movements. The tonic pupil may become smaller (miotic) over time which is referred to as "little old Adie's". Because the fellow eye sometimes becomes involved, long-standing bilateral tonic pupils can resemble Argyll Robertson pupils. The Adie pupil is distinguished by slow, sustained near constriction with slow redilation. In contrast, the Argyll Robertson pupil constricts briskly to near.

Dilute pilocarpine (0.125%; 0.0625% is also used) constricts the tonic pupil more than the normal pupil because of cholinergic denervation supersensitivity. The test has limitations:

- Supersensitivity is absent in about 20% of patients.
- The test may be negative in the acute phase.
- Up to two-thirds of preganglionic third nerve lesions also test positive.
- At 0.125%, the normal eye may also constrict.

Besides Argyll Roberston pupil, the differential also includes oculomotor nerve palsy, pharmacologic mydriasis, and congenital mydriasis. Syphilis serology is reasonable, particularly in bilateral cases. Neuroimaging is not needed in typical cases.

== Treatment ==
The usual treatment of Adie syndrome is to prescribe reading glasses to correct for impairment of the eye(s). Dilute pilocarpine drops may be administered as a treatment as well as a diagnostic measure. Thoracic sympathectomy is the definitive treatment of diaphoresis, if the condition is not treatable by drug therapy.

== Prognosis ==
Adie syndrome is not life-threatening or disabling. As such, there is no mortality rate relating to the condition; however, loss of deep tendon reflexes is permanent and may progress over time.

== Epidemiology ==
It most commonly affects younger women (2.6:1 female preponderance) and is initially unilateral in 80% of cases. About 90% of cases become bilateral with time. Average age of onset is 32 years.

== See also ==
- Ciliary ganglion
- Ross' syndrome
- Harlequin syndrome
