= VRPorn.com =

Virtual reality company

- Available in: English
- Country of origin: United States
- Area served: Worldwide
- Industry: Virtual reality pornography
- Website: vrporn.com
- Registration: Optional
- Launched: 2013

VRPorn.com is an American virtual reality pornography website. It was launched in 2013. VRPorn.com is currently the largest and most popular platform for adult VR content and has content from the top studios such as VR Bangers, VR Conk, Dezyred and more.

== History ==
VRPorn.com was originally created in 2013 as a VR fan site but then shifted to adult content in 2016. The company is based in Los Angeles, United States. As of 2017, most of VRPorn.com's visitors were from North America, Europe, Asia, and Oceania, with more than 8 million monthly visits, and was the highest traffic VR website.

== Content ==
VRPorn.com has thousands of full scene videos from hundreds of different studios, for example BaDoinkVR and VirtualRealPorn. VRPorn.com gates most full videos behind a premium subscription, only showing a few minutes of content to free users. The subscription offers access to videos longer than 10 minutes, whos quality ranges from a resolution of 4k from older productions up to 8k for recent movies. The subscription also includes 30 VR porn games, CGI, augmented reality (AR), extended reality (XR), mixed reality (MR), hentai and POV content.

Its content can be viewed with Oculus Quest, the PlayStation 4 browser, and PlayStation VR. It also supports Oculus Go, Oculus Rift, HTC Vive, Samsung Gear VR, Google Cardboard, Apple, and Android. Web streaming is provided via WebXR.

== See also ==
- BaDoinkVR
- VirtualRealPorn
