= Oculus Go =

Untethered virtual reality headset by Oculus VR

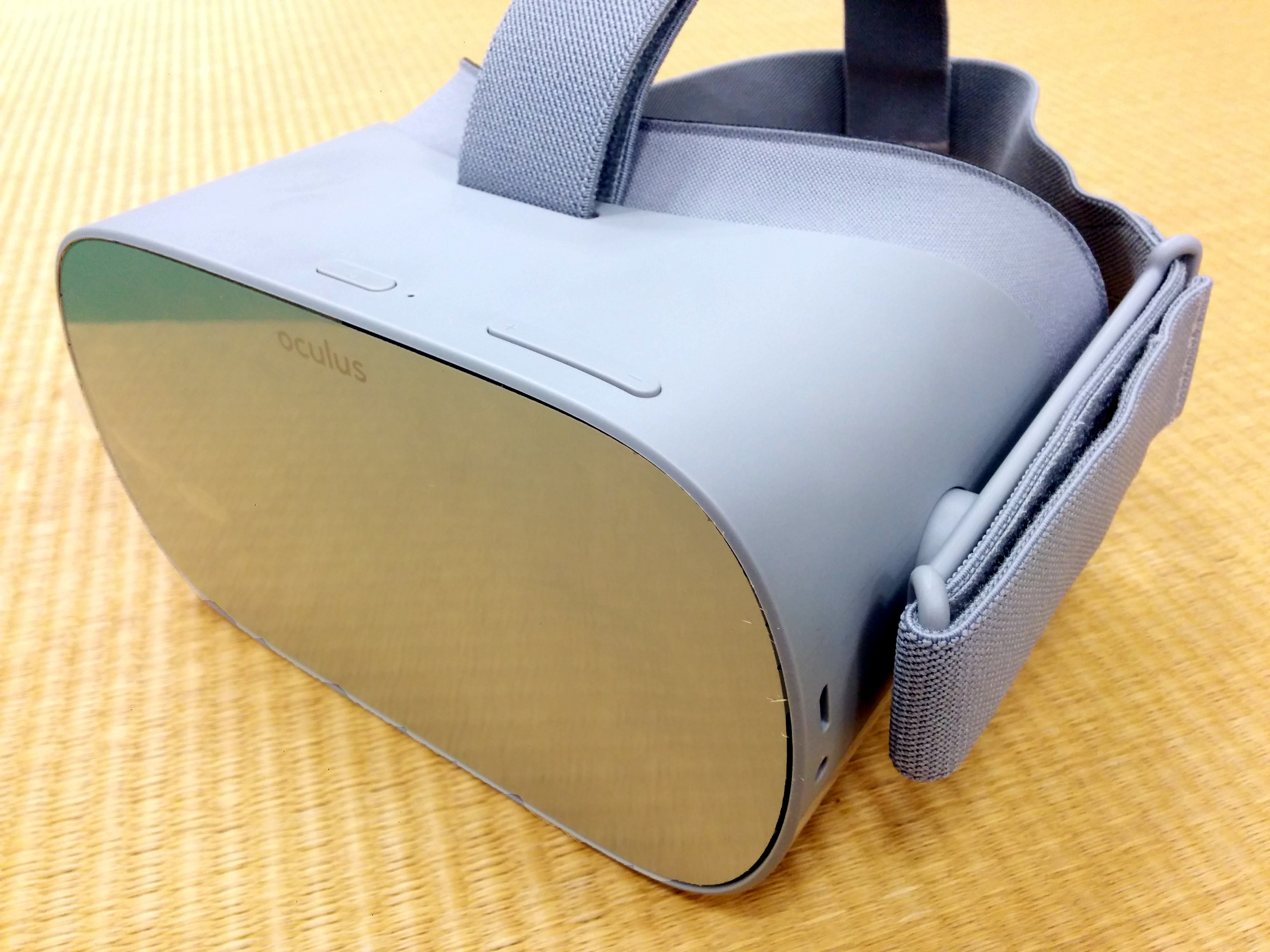
- Codename: Pacific
- Developer: Facebook Technologies, Qualcomm, Xiaomi
- Manufacturer: Facebook Technologies
- Type: Virtual reality headset
- Generation: First generation
- Released: May 1, 2018
- Lifespan: 2018–2020
- Introductory price: US$199 (32 GB model); US$249 (64 GB model)
- Discontinued: June 23, 2020
- Units sold: See Sales section
- Operating system: Quest system software, using Android 7.0
- System on a chip: Qualcomm Snapdragon 821
- Memory: 3 GB (LPDDR4)
- Storage: 32 GB or 64 GB NAND flash
- Display: 5.5" fast-switching LCD (RGB-stripe); 2560×1440 resolution (1280×1440 per eye); 60 to 72 Hz refresh rate; 12.67 pixels per degree
- Graphics: Adreno 530
- Sound: Integrated speakers; 3.5 mm headphone jack
- Input: non-positional 3DOF tracking
- Controller input: Oculus Go controller (primary input device); Bluetooth gamepads (supported by some games)
- Connectivity: Micro-USB; IEEE 802.11ac Wi-Fi; Bluetooth 4.1 (gamepads only)
- Online services: Oculus Store
- Dimensions: 190 mm × 105 mm × 115 mm (7.48 in × 4.13 in × 4.53 in)
- Weight: 468 g (1.032 lb)
- Backward compatibility: Most software developed for the Samsung Gear VR
- Predecessor: Samsung Gear VR
- Related: Oculus Quest; Oculus Rift S
- Website: Official website

The Oculus Go is a discontinued, standalone virtual reality headset developed by Meta Reality Labs (formerly Facebook Technologies) in partnership with Qualcomm and Xiaomi. It is in the first generation of Facebook Technologies' virtual reality headsets, and the company's first device in the category of standalone VR headsets, which was a new category at the time of the Go's release. The Oculus Go was unveiled on October 11, 2017 during the Oculus Connect developer conference, and released on May 1, 2018. Xiaomi launched their own version of the headset in China as the Mi VR Standalone on May 31, 2018.

The Go is an all-in-one headset, meaning it contains all the necessary components to provide virtual reality experiences and does not need to be tethered to an external device to use. It is equipped with a Qualcomm Snapdragon 821 chipset and a single 5.5-inch LCD with a resolution of 1280 × 1440 pixels per eye and a refresh rate of 72 or 60 Hz, depending on the application. The headset uses Fresnel lenses that are improved over those used in the company's previous headset, the Oculus Rift, and provide a field of view of about 101 degrees, which gives the Go a display fidelity of 12.67 pixels per degree. (Note: For virtual reality headsets, pixels per degree (PPD) is a more useful measurement than just display resolution. Pixels per degree is calculated by dividing the number of horizontal pixels by the horizontal field of view provided by the lens.) Input is provided with a wireless controller that functions much like a laser pointer. The headset and controller utilise non-positional 3-degrees-of-freedom tracking, making it capable of seated or static-standing activities but unsuitable for roomscale applications.

The headset uses the Android mobile operating system and includes applications for watching both traditional and immersive video and other media from various sources, such as Facebook and the headset's internal storage, as well as streaming services such as YouTube, Netflix, and Hulu. Additional software is provided via the Oculus Store, a digital distribution platform created and maintained by Facebook Technologies.

The headset was announced on October 11, 2017 and released on May 1, 2018 to generally positive reviews. By July 2019, the Go was estimated to have sold over two million units. On June 23, 2020, Facebook Technologies announced it would be ending the sales of the Oculus Go later that year and would not accept new Go apps or app updates into the Oculus Store after 4 December 2020.

== History ==
Facebook Technologies' involvement in creating a portable form factor headset dates back to the company's early days as Oculus VR. While in discussion with Samsung about displays for the Oculus Rift, Oculus's then-CEO, Brendan Iribe, was shown a mock-up phone holder headset that Samsung wanted help developing. Oculus agreed to a partnership with Samsung, and in 2014 the result was publicly revealed as the Gear VR Innovator Edition. While Samsung built the hardware, Oculus developed the necessary application software, the Oculus Mobile SDK, tracking sensor firmware, and optimized Android and the required GPU drivers for virtual reality. The application software developed by Oculus for Gear VR included Oculus Home, a portal for accessing virtual reality content, an app store called the Oculus Store, and Oculus Cinema, an application for watching movies in various virtual environments. The Oculus Store was later used as the app store for the Oculus Go. In 2015 Oculus Cinema was replaced by Oculus Video, an app with similar functionality that was also included with the Oculus Go at the headset's launch. The Oculus Mobile SDK was later utilised to also allow development of software for the Oculus Go and Xiaomi Mi VR.

Rumors of an all-in-one Oculus headset first surfaced in July 2017 when Bloomberg reported that later that year Oculus would announce an affordable virtual reality headset that didn't need to be tethered to a PC or a phone. Codenamed "Pacific", the device would be lighter and more powerful than the Samsung Gear VR and aimed at the use cases of gaming, social networking, and watching videos and movies. It was also reported that the device would be equipped with a mobile Snapdragon chip from Qualcomm, and that Oculus would be partnering with Chinese electronics manufacturer Xiaomi to produce the headset. The device would carry Oculus's branding worldwide with the exception of China, where a custom version of the headset would be Xiaomi-branded and run some Xiaomi software.

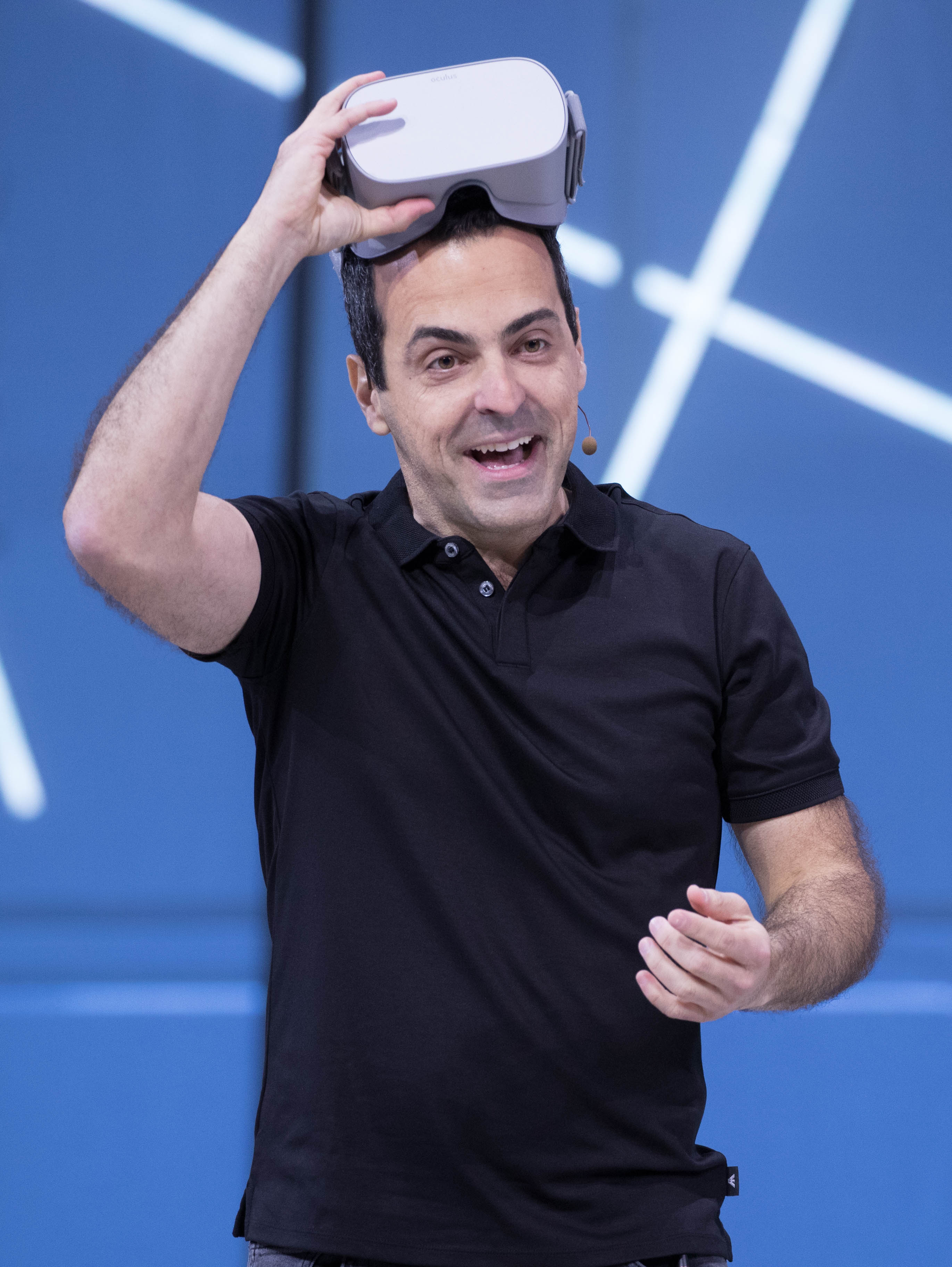
Hugo Barra demonstrating the Oculus Go on stage at 2018's Facebook F8 conference

The headset was officially announced under the name Oculus Go on October 11, 2017 at the Oculus Connect developer conference and was slated to ship in early 2018. Facebook Technologies introduced the device as its first entry into the at-the-time new product category it called "standalone", a class of virtual reality headsets that don't require an external computing device like a smartphone or a personal computer to function. Oculus's partnerships with Qualcomm and Xiaomi, as well as Xiaomi's version of the headset called the Mi VR Standalone, were revealed in January at CES 2018. The Go was officially released on May 1, 2018. Xiaomi released the Mi VR Standalone on May 31, 2018.

On 3 May 2018, Facebook announced a business-oriented bundle of the Oculus Go with commercial warranty, a worldwide multi-prong charger, and two facial interfaces. The bundle began shipping in July 2018. In September 2018, Walmart announced the company would be using Oculus Go headsets to expand its employee VR training program across the U.S. The company would be sending four headsets to every Walmart supercenter and two units to every Neighborhood Market and discount store, with over 17,000 units in stores by the end of 2018.

In January 2020, Facebook lowered the Go's price to US$149 and US$199 for the 32 GB and 64 GB models respectively, down from the launch pricing of US$199 and US$249. Similar price updates were rolled out to all countries where the Go was sold. In the same month, the company also dropped the Oculus Go from its upcoming Oculus for Business program, in which the headset had been available during the platform's closed beta stage.

On June 23, 2020, Facebook Technologies announced it will be ending sales of the Oculus Go later that year and will not accept new Go apps or app updates into the Oculus Store after 4 December 2020. While new features will no longer be introduced to the headset, the system software will continue to be maintained with fixes and security updates through 2022.

In October 2021, Facebook released an update which can be sideloaded to unlock "full root access" to the device hardware. This update is supposed to keep devices operational even after official Facebook cloud infrastructure goes offline.

== Features ==
=== Software ===
A video from the user's point of view, showing the use of the Oculus Go's user interface and the purpose of the Oculus Gallery application

For setting up the Oculus Go, the Oculus application must be downloaded on a mobile phone running Android or iOS. With the Oculus application, the headset is paired to the phone, connected to an account, and the controller is paired with the headset. Applications and content can be downloaded and purchased from the Oculus Store with both the Oculus phone application or from within the headset itself. While pictures and videos can be transferred to the Go from a PC via USB and applications can be sideloaded to the device, many applications require a Wi-Fi connection to function.

Official applications provided with or available for download include Oculus Gallery, Oculus Video, Oculus TV, and Oculus Venues. The Oculus Gallery app can be used to access media stored on the Go's internal memory or from external websites or services such as Facebook, Instagram, Dropbox, or a Wi-Fi-connected media server such as Plex. Oculus Video allows the viewing of trailers, movies, or one's own videos in various virtual environments. The Oculus TV app is used to watch TV in a virtual living room environment via various apps such as Facebook Video, Pluto TV, Netflix, and Hulu. Oculus Venues allows the user to attend live events. The Go's Casting functionality allows the headset's view to be streamed to the phone paired with the Go.

An application called Oculus Rooms was present at the headset's launch, but was discontinued on October 25, 2019. Oculus Rooms was a customizable personal and social space into which users could invite friends to play various board games, listen to music, watch videos, TV, and movies, and play multiplayer games together.

=== Hardware ===
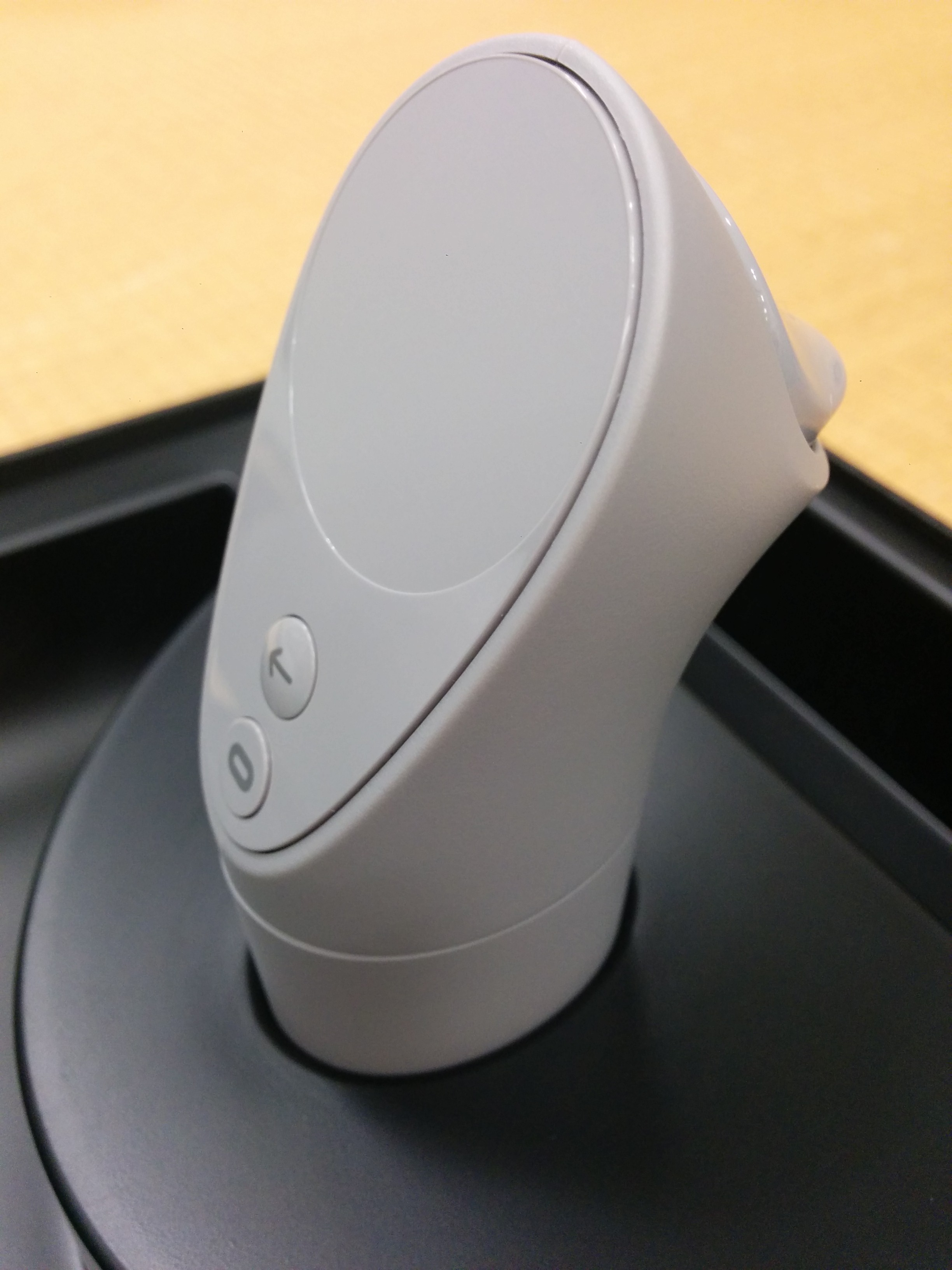
Front view of the Oculus Go controller, showing the touchpad, two front-facing buttons, and a trigger

Unlike mobile headsets like the Samsung Gear VR and Google Daydream that are powered by a smartphone, the Oculus Go is a standalone unit with all the components required to provide virtual reality experiences built into the headset. The headset uses the Qualcomm Snapdragon 821 system on a chip, 3 GB of LPDDR4 RAM, and either 32 or 64 GB of internal storage. The integrated Adreno 530 GPU provides roughly 500 GFLOPS of graphics performance. The device is equipped with a 2600 mAh battery, which provides up to two hours of gaming or 2.5 hours of video playback according to Oculus. The Go has non-positional 3-degrees-of-freedom tracking, a proximity sensor for detecting when the headset is being worn, and a small controller that functions like a laser pointer in the virtual environment.

The headset is outfitted with a fast-switching 5.5-inch LCD with a 2560 × 1440 (1280 × 1440 pixels per eye) resolution in an RGB-stripe subpixel arrangement. The headset has a field of view of about 101 degrees, which gives it a horizontal pixel density of 12.67 pixels per degree. The headset uses Fresnel lenses that are improved over those used in the Oculus Rift and according to Oculus, were the best lenses the company had produced at the time of the Go's release. The headset doesn't feature physical interpupillary distance (IPD) adjustment and has a fixed lens distance of 63.5 mm, which according to Oculus best accommodates users with an IPD between 61.5 and 65.5 mm.

The Oculus Go controller is a wireless, orientation-tracked remote controller with pointer capabilities that is used to interact with applications and games. In addition to a touchpad, the controller has three buttons that can be used to select things, go back to a previous screen or menu, and return to the Go's home screen. The controller is powered by a single AA battery and allows for either hand to be chosen to function through the Oculus Go.

The Go is available in two storage configurations: a model with 32 GB of internal storage for US$149 or 64 GB of internal storage for US$199. While the Go doesn't support external storage, support for USB flash drives via the device's micro USB port was initially planned to be released as an update. However, in November 2019, John Carmack stated the feature wouldn't be released due to a hardware issue Oculus was unable to fix.

Oculus offers accessories and replacement parts through their website, including a carrying case and a fitted facial interface for people with low nose bridges and high or wide cheekbones. A replacement controller and facial interface are also available. In addition, Oculus promotes the online eyewear retailer FramesDirect.com as a source of prescription lenses for the Go. Oculus also offers a business-oriented bundle with additional accessories, warranty, and support.

==== Third-party variants and accessories ====
In January 2019, TPCast announced TPCAST Air for the Oculus Go, a wireless solution that allows VR content to be streamed to the headset from a PC using Wi-Fi. The Air is aimed for architecture, engineering, and construction industries as well as interior design and education, and is shipped together with an Oculus Go headset.

In February 2019, virtual reality porn producer BaDoinkVR began selling Porn In-a-Box, a 32 GB Oculus Go model pre-loaded with adult content. The content is accessed via an app pre-installed to the device by BaDoinkVR. Badoink's latest offering, dubbed "Porn In-a-Box" was an attempt to provide a realistic sexual experience. Badoink's Oculus Go 32 GB headsets costed $299, which was $100 more than the original Oculus Go model.

== Reception ==
The headset released to generally positive reviews. Critics praised the Go's design and feel, display, built-in speakers, and reasonable price, while criticising its lack of fast charging, limited motion tracking and lack of expandable storage. Software and content had reviewers divided, with some reacting positively to the amount of third-party apps and content available for the device at launch, while others saw the software selection as slim and criticised its quality and the lack of a killer app. CNET characterised the headset as "VR for the masses" – a view echoed by other publications – while The Verge stated it was "the best that simple mobile VR has ever been" and "good, but not great."

In May 2018, Andreas Hronopoulos, CEO of adult entertainment company Naughty America, described the Go as "a game changer" and said that the company had seen an increase in sales of VR content since the Oculus Go went on sale earlier that month. Xavi Clos, head of production at BaDoinkVR, expected the device to act as a major gateway to the company's content and described the Oculus Go as "the perfect porn device."

=== Sales ===
While official sales numbers have not been released, according to IDC the Oculus Go and Xiaomi Mi VR had sold nearly a quarter million units combined during the third quarter of 2018. During Facebook's Q4 2018 earnings call, the company's CFO revealed that the Oculus Go had contributed to the company's revenue during the quarter, but had also increased marketing costs. In January 2019, market analysis firm SuperData estimated that over a million Oculus Go units had been sold since the device's launch, and in July 2019 the firm estimated over two million units had been sold.

In his keynote at 2018's Oculus Connect developer conference, John Carmack revealed that the Go's retention rate was as high as the Rift's, something that nobody at the company had predicted. Carmack also noted that the Go had done especially well in Japan despite the device's lacking internationalization support and the company not specifically catering to the Japanese market. During 2019's Oculus Connect, Carmack noted that the Go's retention rate had been measured to be more than twice that of the Samsung Gear VR.

According to Hugo Barra, former Head of Oculus at Meta, "Most users who bought Oculus Go completely abandoned the headset after a few weeks", however "the Oculus Go failure got us on the path to Oculus Quest very quickly".
