= Xbox Wireless Controller =

Primary game controller for the Xbox platform

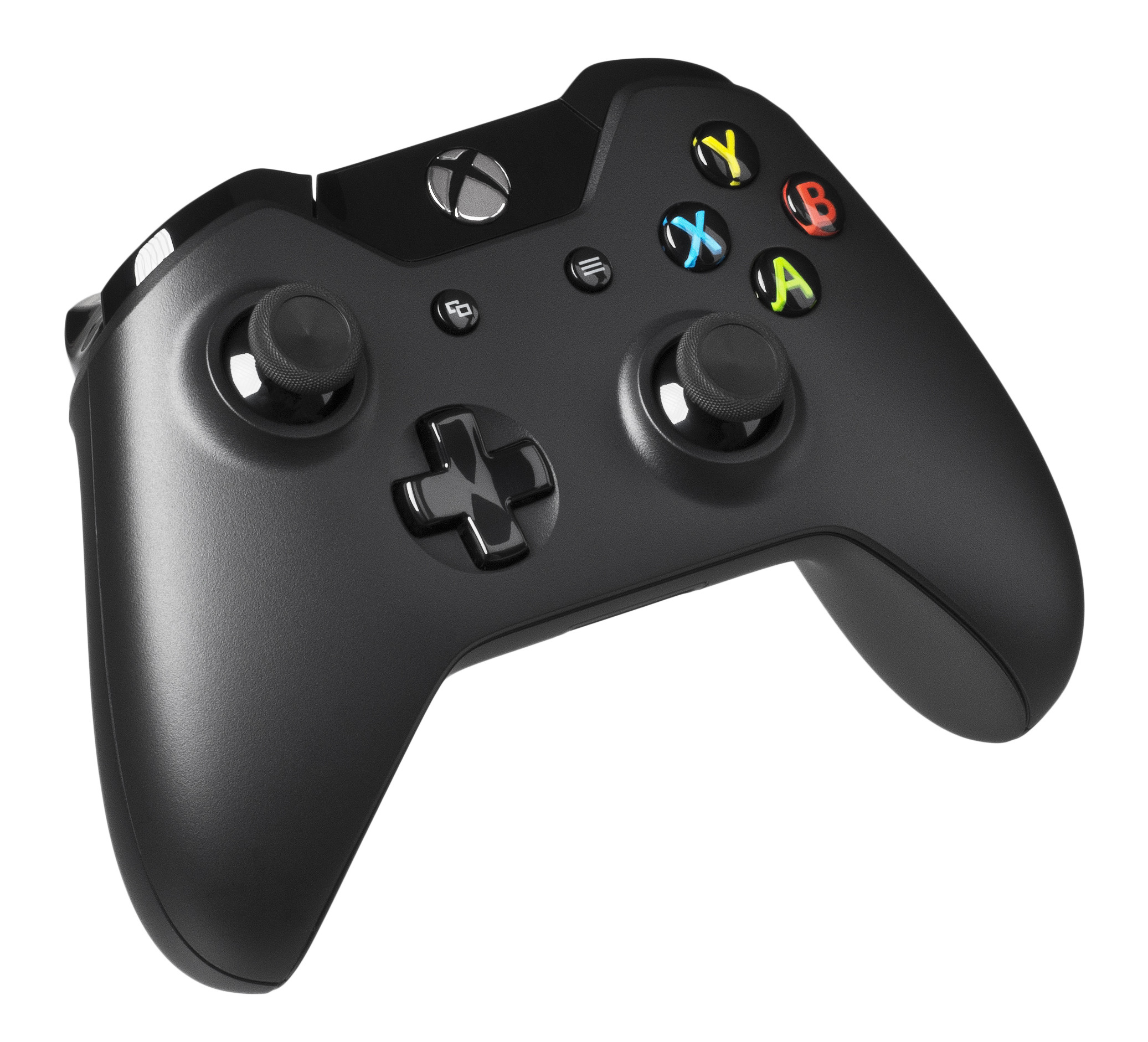
- A black Xbox One Wireless Controller
- Developer: Microsoft
- Manufacturer: Microsoft
- Type: Gamepad
- Generation: Eighth and ninth
- Released: NA/AU: November 22, 2013; EU: November 22, 2013 (some countries, 2014 for others); JP: September 4, 2014; BRA: December 1, 2014
- Lifespan: 2013—present
- Input: Digital D-pad; 2 × analog triggers (LT, RT); 2 × shoulder buttons (LB, RB); 2 × clickable Analog sticks (left stick click, right stick click); 7 × digital buttons (Y, B, A, X, Menu, View, Xbox); Wireless pairing button; Share button (third revision)
- Connectivity: Wireless; Micro USB (revisions prior to Elite Series 2); USB-C (Elite Series 2 and third revision); 3.5 mm stereo audio jack (after first revision); Bluetooth 4.0 (second revision); Bluetooth LE (third revision)
- Current firmware: 2.3.2385.0; 5.23.6.0 (second and third revision)
- Dimensions: 6.02 in × 4.01 in × 2.4 in 153 mm × 102 mm × 61 mm
- Predecessor: Xbox 360 controller

The Xbox Wireless Controller is the primary game controller for Microsoft's Xbox One and Xbox Series X/S home video game consoles, as well as the official controller for use on Windows-based PCs. It is also compatible with other operating systems such as macOS, Linux, iOS and Android. The controller maintains the overall layout found in the Xbox 360 controller, but with various tweaks to its design, such as a revised shape, redesigned analog sticks, shoulder buttons, and triggers, along with new rumble motors within the triggers to allow for directional haptic feedback.

The controller has had three revisions, with several changes to its design and functionality. Microsoft also markets the Elite Wireless Controller, a premium version that includes interchangeable parts and programmability features. In turn, each of the aforementioned variations has been offered in various color schemes, with some featuring special designs tying into specific games. The Xbox Series X and Series S introduced an updated version of the controller, with further refinements to its shape and ergonomics.

== Layout ==
View

Menu

The Xbox One controller retains roughly the same layout as the Xbox 360 controller, including four main face buttons, two shoulder bumpers, two analog triggers, two analog sticks and a digital D-pad. The Start and Back buttons are replaced by Menu and View buttons, while the Guide button, now officially called the Xbox button (whereas this was merely a common nickname for it on the Xbox 360 controller), consists of a white backlit Xbox logo, and does not feature the ring of light that served as an indicator for the controller's assigned number (1 to 4).

== Design ==
Microsoft invested over $100 million into refining the controller design for the Xbox One; internal designers had created prototypes with various tweaks and refinements to the design over the Xbox 360 controller, along with those including unorthodox features such as embedded screens and speakers (which were rejected due to their effects on battery life, and redundancy to the main display and sound system), and the ability to emit odors.

The Xbox One controller maintains the overall layout found in the Xbox 360 controller's design, but with enhancements such as redesigned grips, a smoother build, and the removal of the protruding battery compartment. The controller also contains light emitters that allow it to be tracked and paired using Kinect sensor, and to detect when it is not being held to automatically enter a low-power state. The controller contains a micro USB port, enabling wired use of the controller with the console or on computers running Windows 7 or later with drivers, and firmware updates. For communication, the controller uses a new proprietary protocol with a greater bandwidth than the wireless protocol used by the Xbox 360 controller, reducing latency and allowing for higher quality headset audio. Up to eight controllers can be connected wirelessly to the console at the same time; if controllers also are supporting wireless chat audio via the Chat Headset, four controllers can be connected simultaneously, and if the controllers are providing wireless chat and stereo in-game audio via the Stereo Headset, two controllers can be connected simultaneously.

The analog sticks feature a new textured rim, while the D-pad was changed to use a more traditional 4-way design rather than the circular 8-way design of the 360 controller. This change was made partially due to criticism by players of fighting games who, despite the use of "sweeps" across the D-pad in these games being part of the motivation for the 8-way design, thought that the Xbox 360's D-pad performed poorly in that type of game. The updated 4-way design is also better suited for use as individual keys in games that use them for item selection. The design of the face buttons was revised to improve their legibility, using a three-layer design consisting of a black background, colored letter, and a clear covering intended to make the letter appear to "hover" inside it. The buttons themselves are also spaced slightly closer together.

The bumpers and trigger buttons were overhauled with a new curved shape to improve their ergonomics, as the user's fingers now naturally lie at an angle upon them unlike the straighter design on Xbox 360 controllers. The bumpers were also made flush with the triggers. The triggers themselves now have a smoother feel, and are made more accurate. Each trigger features independent rumble motors called "Impulse Triggers", which allows developers to program directional vibration. One trigger can be made to vibrate when firing a gun, or both can work together to create feedback that indicates the direction of an incoming hit.

=== Xbox Wireless ===
After 2016, when Bluetooth connectivity was introduced with the second controller revision (model 1708) alongside the Xbox One S, Microsoft rebranded its proprietary connection protocol as "Xbox Wireless". Xbox Wireless uses the same frequency range as Bluetooth (2.40-2.48 GHz), but has a higher transmit power, improving range and input latency. Starting in 2017, Microsoft began working with third-party manufacturers to produce additional accessories using Xbox Wireless, with the first class being headsets.

With a firmware update that began rolling out in September 2021, controllers with Bluetooth are able to pair with devices using both wireless protocols, allowing those controllers to switch connections by double-tapping the pairing button.

=== Xbox Controller Assist ===
The Xbox Wireless Controller has a game accessibility feature called "Xbox Controller Assist" (formerly "Xbox Copilot"), supported on Xbox and Windows, which allows a second controller to be used to assist in game input.

== Models ==
=== Base model ===
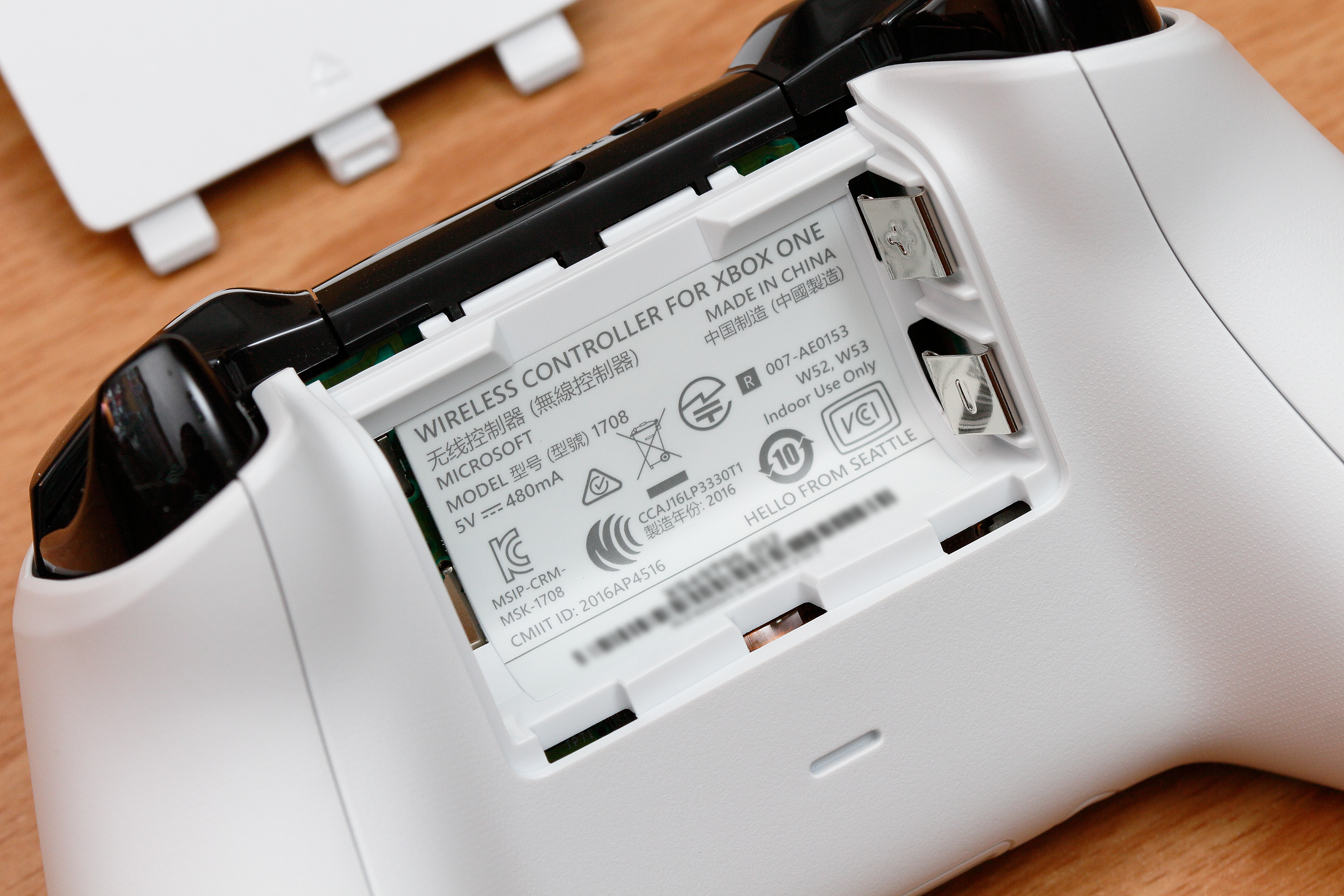
Location of model number, on printed label inside battery compartment. This is the model 1708 (2016 revision) controller.

==== Original version (2013) ====
The original controller (model 1537) launched with the Xbox One console in November 2013 was black, with colored face buttons. A commemorative white variant was issued to Microsoft employees at launch, but was not available to the public until almost a year later, initially bundled with a matching white console and Sunset Overdrive.

==== First revision (2015) ====
On June 9, 2015, Microsoft unveiled a revised version of the standard controller, with model 1697. Its shoulder buttons were redesigned for improved responsiveness, a 3.5 mm headphone jack was added near the controller's expansion port, and support for wireless firmware updates was added.

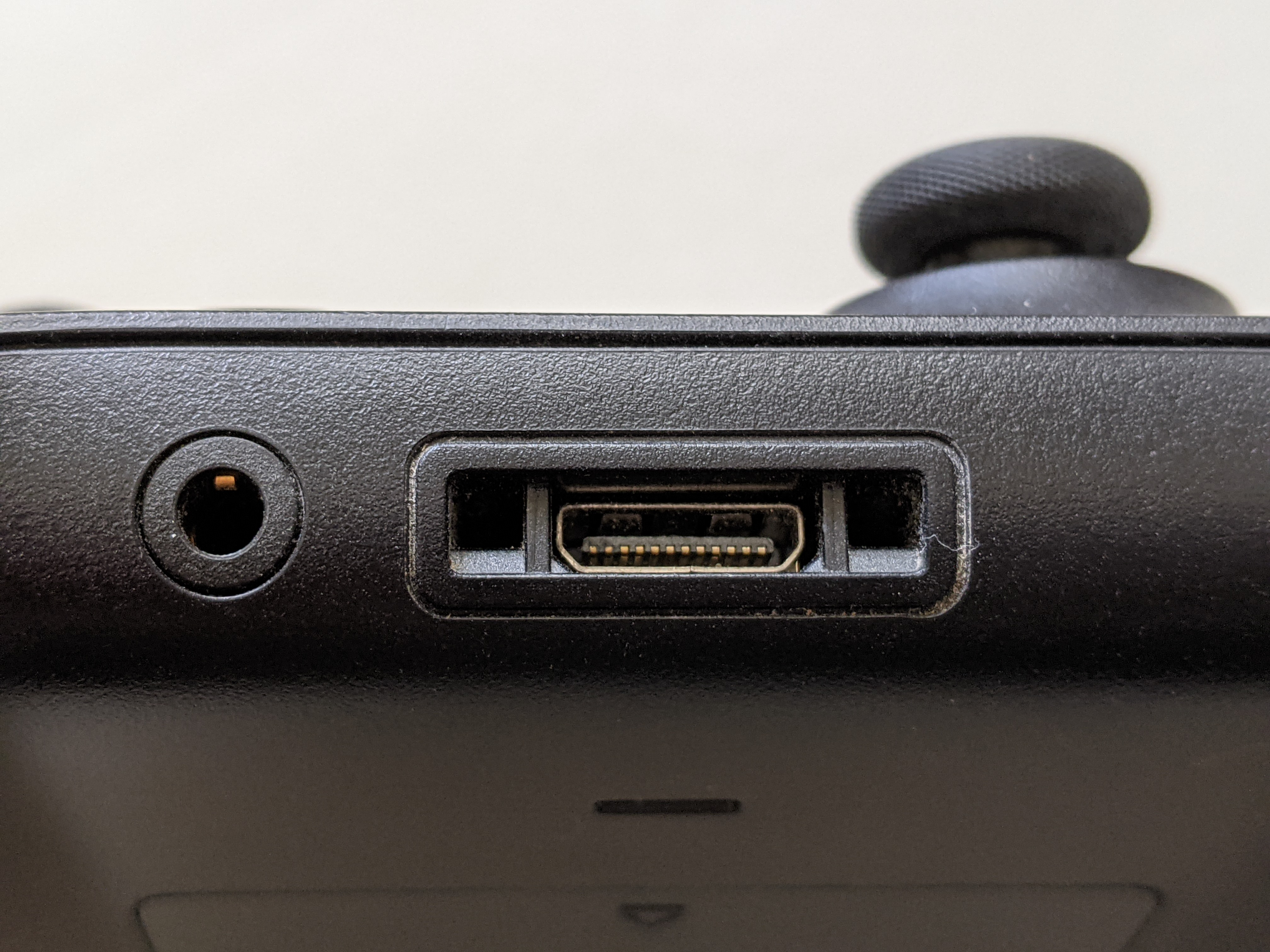
Analog (3.5 mm) headset jack (L) and digital chatpad/headset adapter interface, model 1697 controller

==== Second revision (2016) ====
A second revision of the controller, model 1708, was introduced alongside the Xbox One S, an updated model of the Xbox One console unveiled in June 2016. It features textured grips, and additionally supports Bluetooth for use with compatible PCs and mobile devices. Users can also custom-order this controller revision via the "Xbox Design Lab" service, with their choice of colors, and an optional inscription of their Xbox Live screen name for an additional fee.

The second revision can be distinguished from prior revisions by the color and texture of the plastic surrounding the lit Xbox/guide button. Prior controller models 1537 and 1697 have a separate piece of black glossy plastic, with the model 1698 "Elite" also having a separate piece in black, dark red, or white. In the second revision (model 1708) the front shell of the controller is a single piece, and the part surrounding the Xbox button now matches the texture and color of the controller. It has been made available in white, black, red, and blue colors, as well as other limited edition colors.

==== Third revision (2020) ====
Share button

A third revision of the controller, model 1914, was released in November 2020, bundled with Xbox Series X and Series S, while still backward-compatible with existing Xbox One consoles. It has a refined build with a slightly smaller body, a "Share" button on the center of the controller below the "View" and "Menu" buttons, a circular dished D-pad similar to the Elite controller, and a USB-C connector instead of USB Micro-B. The controller also supports Bluetooth Low Energy, and can be paired to a Bluetooth device and an Xbox device simultaneously. The controller also includes Dynamic Latency Input, sending controller information to the console more frequently and in time with the current framerate as to reduce the latency between user input and reaction in the game. Starting in September 2021 through the Xbox Insider program, Microsoft started rolling out the improved Bluetooth and latency features from these newer controllers to its official Xbox One controllers, including the Xbox Adaptive Controller.

Microsoft announced in June 2021 that the Xbox Design Lab will continue with the Series X/S controllers, allowing users to create their own custom designs.

=== Elite controller ===
Elite Controller

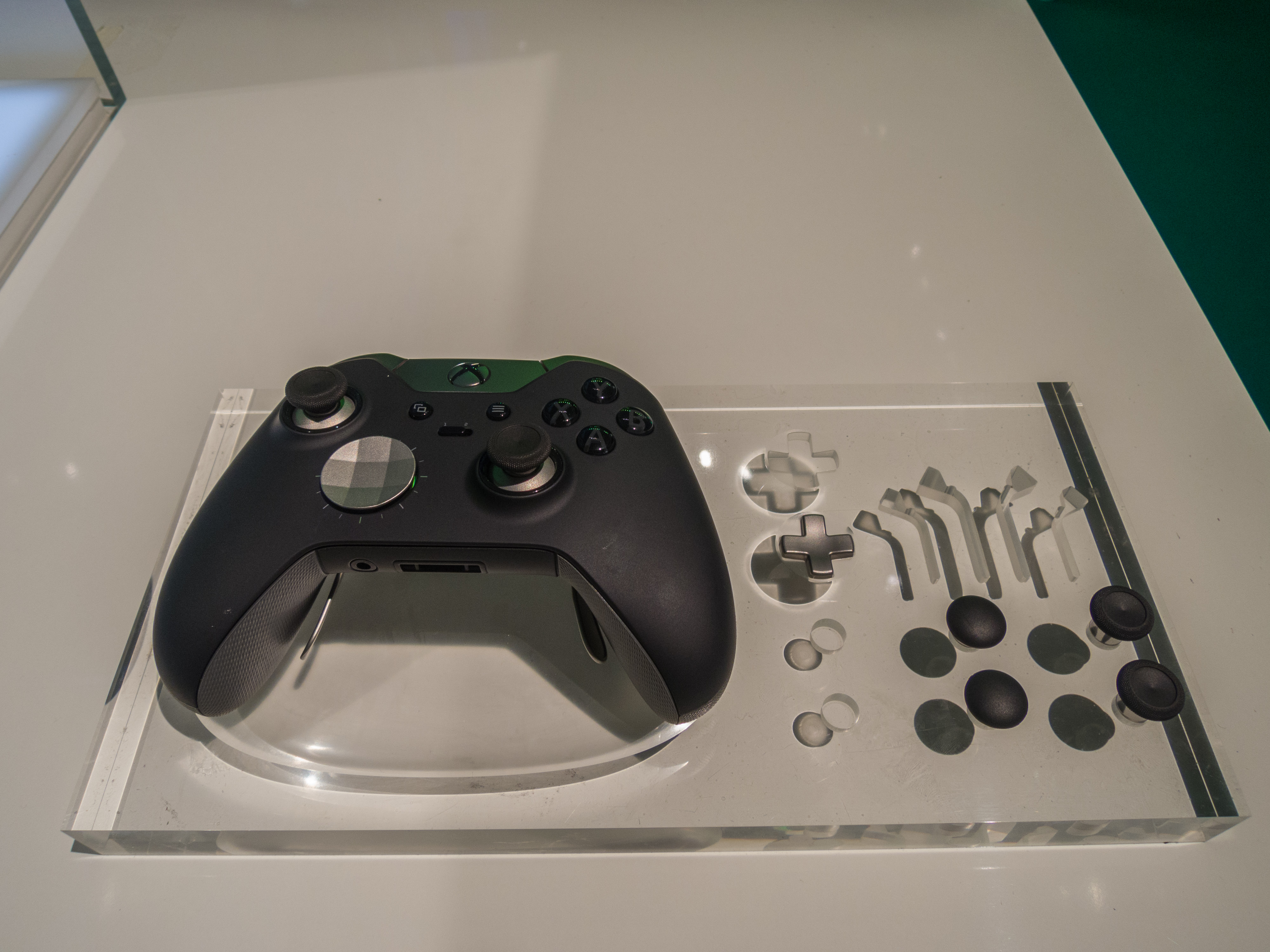
Elite on display at Gamescom 2015, with accessories

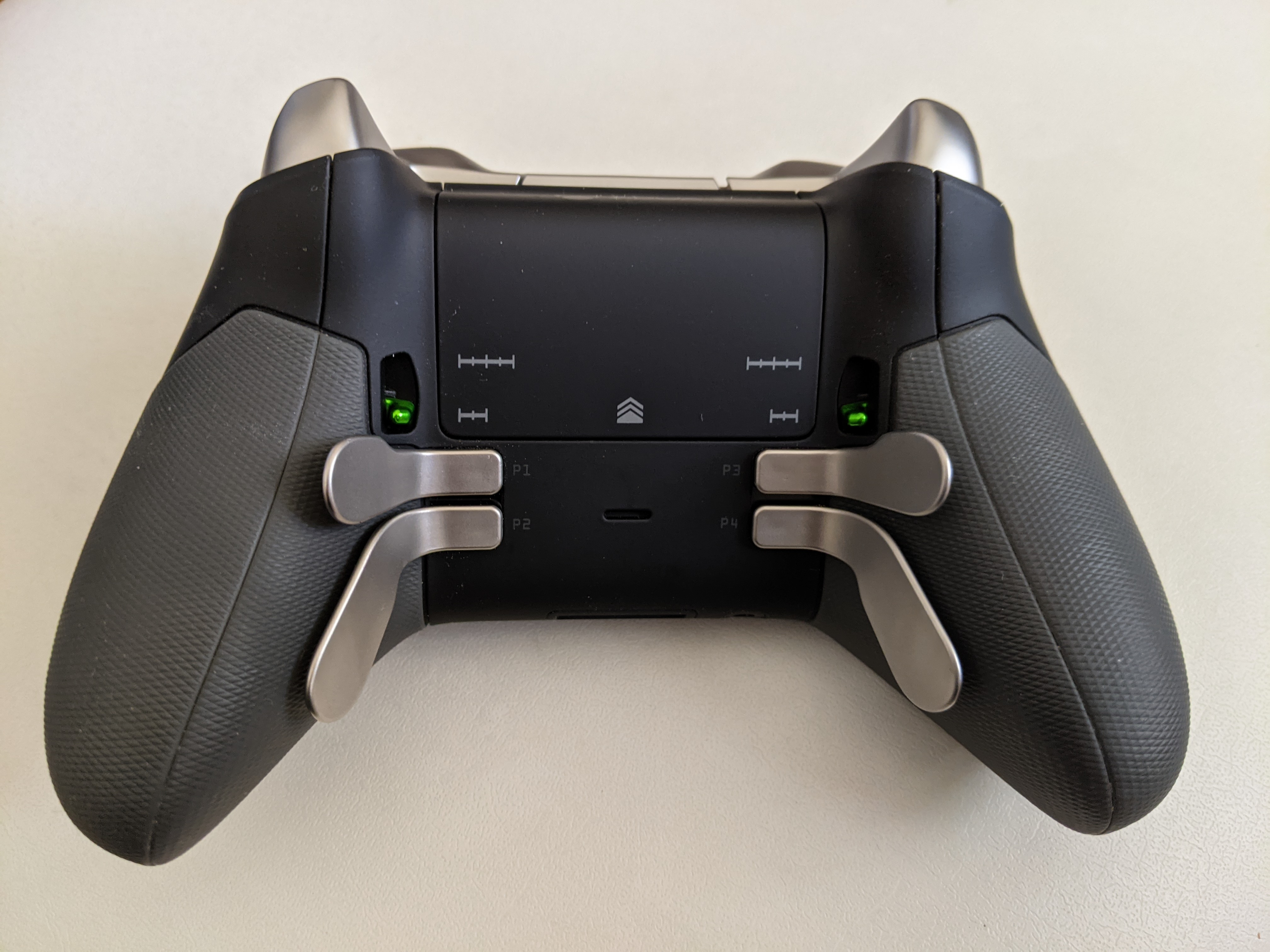
Underside, with paddles installed and reduced trigger distance

On June 15, 2015, during its E3 2015 press conference, Microsoft unveiled the Xbox One Elite Wireless Controller, a new controller which Xbox division head Phil Spencer described as being "an elite controller for the elite gamer". It features a steel construction with a soft-touch plastic exterior, along with interchangeable rear paddle buttons (with either short or long forms), analog stick tops (original Xbox One stick, a convex dome, and an extended version for increased accuracy), and directional pad designs (either the traditional four-way design, or a concave disc-like design), and "hair trigger locks" for the triggers that allow users to reduce the amount of distance required to register a press. Through software, users can customize button and paddle mappings and adjust the sensitivity of the triggers and analog sticks. Two button profiles can be assigned to a switch on the controller for quick access. The Elite Controller was released on October 27, 2015.

==== Cosmetic variants ====
A special Gears of War 4-themed limited edition variant of the Elite controller was unveiled during Microsoft's E3 2016 press conference. It features a rustic, dark red color scheme with a blood splatter effect and the series emblem on the rear of the controller, and a D-pad disc with weapon symbols corresponding to the in-game weapons bound to these controls.

A White Special Edition of the controller was announced on August 29, 2018. Although a revised Elite controller was leaked early in 2018 incorporating functional changes, the White Special Edition was another cosmetic variant of the original Elite.

==== Series 2 ====
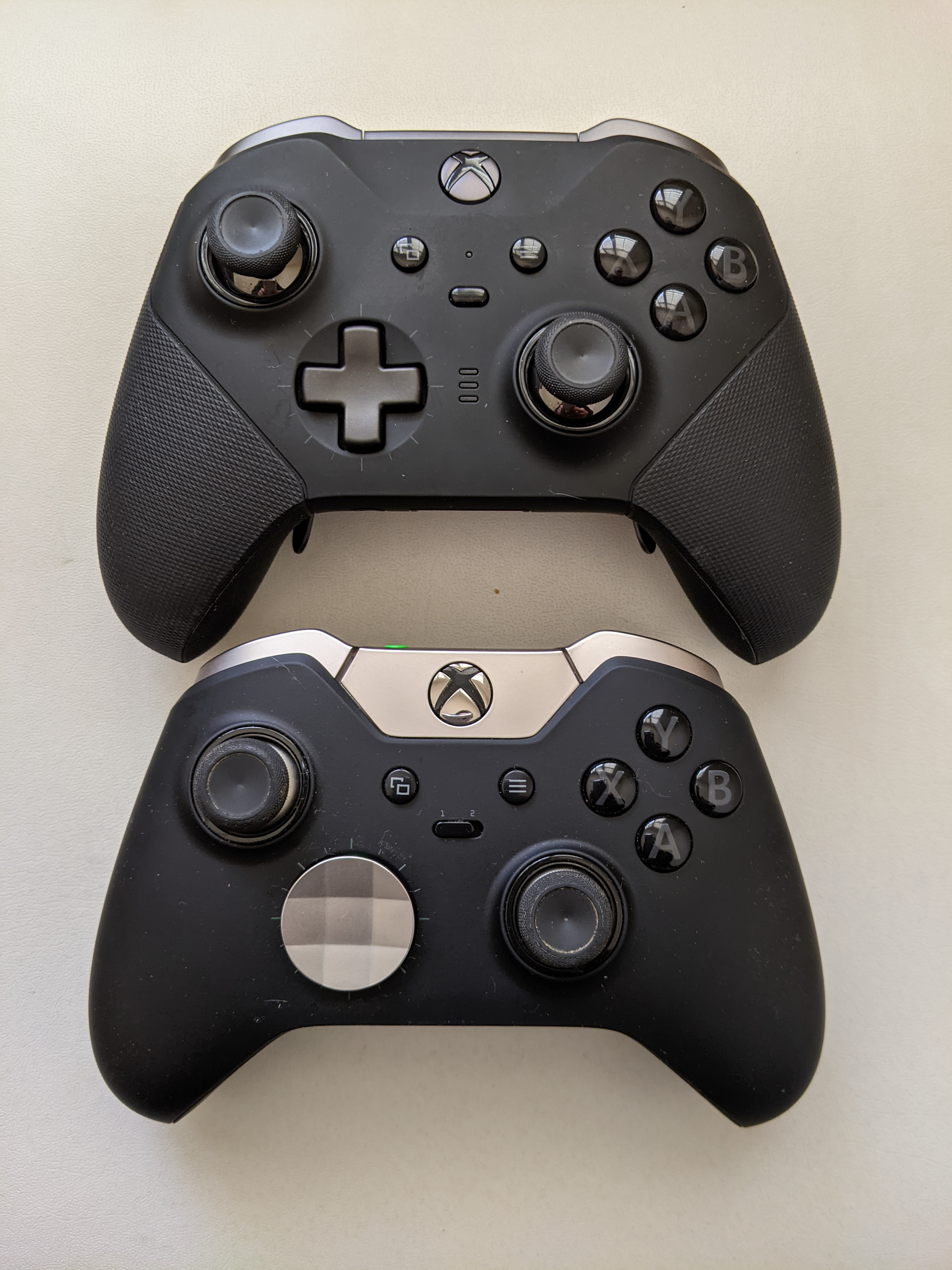
Series 2 (top) and original Elite (bottom) controllers

Plans for a revised version of the Elite controller were leaked in January 2018, with a number of new features, including USB-C connector, and other hardware improvements such as three-level Hair Trigger Locks, adjustable tension for the thumbsticks, revised rubber grips, three user-defined profile settings, and Bluetooth connectivity, which had been introduced with the revised Xbox One S controller in 2016.

At E3 2019, Microsoft announced they would begin taking pre-orders for the Xbox Elite Wireless Controller Series 2; the controller would be available starting on November 4, 2019.

In general, accessories (such as the thumbsticks and paddles) are not interchangeable between the Series 2 and Series 1 Elite controllers. The case bundled with the Elite 2 included a removable charging dock (model 1924) for the controller's built-in battery and a pass-through to connect a USB-C cable with a port on the dock.

Preorders for the Elite Series 2 Core controller were opened in September 2022 at a discounted price; the controller is the same as the Elite Series 2, but the plastic body and buttons of the Core version are white and the Core does not include the interchangeable thumbsticks and paddles accessories. The "Complete Component Pack" can be purchased separately, adding the carrying case, charging dock, and interchangeable accessories, which makes the Core + Component Pack equivalent to the standard Elite Series 2. Like the regular Elite 2, the face button centered between the View and Menu buttons is a profile select button, not the Capture/Share button on the standard Xbox Wireless Controller (2020 revision, model 1914).

=== Codename Sebile ===
Internal marketing materials for an unreleased revision of the controller, codenamed "Sebile", were leaked in court documents posted publicly with the 2022 FTC v. Microsoft lawsuit. This version would be publicly named Xbox Universal Controller, and was internally scheduled to launch in May 2024. Sebile's release had likely been delayed, according to official confirmation about "new controller options" coming in "Holiday 2024", meaning the Christmas of 2024. The Xbox Universal Controller would have been equipped with Bluetooth 5.2 and modular thumbsticks. In addition, it would have featured "precision haptic feedback" using voice coil actuators and an accelerometer, which would provide lift-to-wake functionality.

Sebile would have been designed to promote sustainable practices by using more recycled materials and supporting easier disassembly and accessibility for repair; it also would have included a rechargeable battery that could be removed and replaced.

=== Summary ===
All of the controllers in this table are fully compatible with any of the Xbox One consoles, up to Series X/S.

Xbox Wireless Controller model summary
Model (Note: The model number is printed on the sticker in the battery compartment.)	Introduction	Discontinued	3.5 mm jack	Bluetooth	USB	Thumbnail	Notes
1537	2013	2015	No	No	Micro-B		Controllers packed with launch-day systems are marked "DAY ONE 2013" with chrome d-pad. Microsoft employees were given a customized white version of the 1537 controller marked "I made this".
1697	2015	2016	Yes	No	Micro-B		Standard 3.5 mm audio jack added to bottom of controller. The bumper buttons have been rehinged to make them easier to press. Capable of receiving firmware updates wirelessly from Xbox One console.
1698 "Elite"	2015	2019	Yes	No	Micro-B		Interchangeable thumbsticks and d-pad; detachable paddles on underside duplicating face buttons; rubberized grip; trigger locks. Standard color scheme is black and silver, but the Elite controller was later available in a predominantly red special edition Gears of War 4-branded theme and a Robot White theme.
1708	2016	2020	Yes	Yes	Micro-B		Introduced with the Xbox One S. Distinguished from earlier versions by texture and color of plastic surrounding Xbox home button, which now matches the rest of the controller body. Includes Bluetooth connectivity (Classic Bluetooth HID profile) in addition to the prior proprietary wireless protocol. Bluetooth LE (HID over GATT Profile) connectivity was added in a 2021 firmware update.
1797 (Note: Because the Elite Series 2 has an internal battery, the model number is printed in black ink on the bottom of the controller.) "Elite 2"	2019	—	Yes	Yes (BLE)	Type C		Compared to the 1698 "Elite", "Elite 2" adds a third trigger lock position, adjustable thumbstick tension, extended rubber grip (wrapping around to the front side), Bluetooth connectivity (Classic Bluetooth HID profile), and an internal rechargeable battery. Bluetooth LE (HID over GATT Profile) connectivity was added in a 2021 firmware update.
1914	2020	—	Yes	Yes (Only BLE)	Type C		Introduced with the Xbox Series X and Series S consoles, featuring a slightly smaller body, a "Share" button, a faceted concave D-pad similar to the Elite Controller, and a USB-C connector.

== Colors and styles ==
Besides standard colors, "special" and "limited edition" Xbox Wireless Controllers have also been sold by Microsoft with special color and design schemes, sometimes tying into specific games.

=== Xbox Design Lab ===
On June 13, 2016, Microsoft launched the Xbox Design Lab (XDL) service, initially restricted to the US, which made custom color combinations available for the Xbox One S controller (model 1708) at extra cost. Initially, clients could choose one of fifteen colors for each of five different sections of the controller (body, back, bumpers, triggers, D-pad); one of eight colors for the thumbsticks; five choices for face (ABXY) buttons; and four choices for the View/Menu buttons, which according to Microsoft, allowed for approximately eight million distinct possible combinations. Additionally, customers could request laser-engraved text up to 16 characters for an additional fee.

Over time, more design choices have been progressively added, and the service was extended to clients in Europe.

In November 2017, Microsoft made each of the 32 NFL team logos available as an option for the front of the controller, printed on a Robot White background.

Also in 2017, Xbox partnered with McCann London to launch the "Xbox Design Lab Originals" program; the program, which McCann called "The Fanchise Model", allows consumers to earn a portion of the sales by creating and marketing their custom designs through Xbox Design Lab. Social media influencers began advertising the service on April 1, 2017, and a feature that allowed consumers to "claim [their] design" was added to the store on May 1, with retail support commencing on May 30. The program was credited with increasing controller sales by 350%. It was awarded the Grand Prix at the Cannes Lions International Festival of Creativity in 2018 by the Creative eCommerce Lions and Clio Awards in multiple categories, including public relations and games.

Starting October 14, 2020, the XDL service was suspended temporarily to June 17, 2021, when it restarted using the newest controller (model 1914) introduced with the Series X/S.

In June 2022, alongside four new pastel colors and five camouflage patterns, a Pride design was added to the Design Lab. a Pride-themed controller previously had been sent to key influencers and media in 2021, but the 2021 controller was not initially available for purchase.

In October 2022, the Elite Series 2 was added as an option for the Xbox Design Lab, and custom colors can now be selected for the thumbstick base and rings.

== Support on other platforms ==
Drivers were released in June 2014 to allow Xbox One controllers to be used over a USB connection on PCs running Windows 7 or later. The Xbox One Wireless Adapter for Windows is a USB dongle that allows up to eight controllers to be used at once wirelessly.

Per a partnership between Microsoft and Oculus VR, the Oculus Rift CV1 virtual reality headset initially included an Xbox One controller, up until the launch of the Oculus Touch motion controllers.

On Windows 10, support for the controller is built-in, including support for wireless audio when using the wireless dongle or USB cable (it is not supported over Bluetooth). The controller is also manageable via the Xbox Accessories app, whose features include button remapping (for both the regular and Elite controller), input tests, and firmware update. On Windows 7 or 8.1, drivers are required, and the aforementioned features are not available.

Microsoft also supports Bluetooth-enabled Xbox One controllers on Android, specifically listing support for Minecraft: Gear VR Edition on certain Samsung Galaxy devices.

On Linux, Xbox One controllers are supported by the xpad USB driver. There also exists an alternative xpadneo driver, which supports some controller revisions that are not supported by the xpad driver, as well as additional features. Some of these additional features, such as driver support for the trigger rumble motors, aren't even supported on Windows 10.

In June 2019, Apple announced support for Bluetooth-enabled Xbox One controllers in iOS 13, macOS Catalina and tvOS 13, which became available in the fall of 2019.

== Accessories ==
=== Chat Headset ===
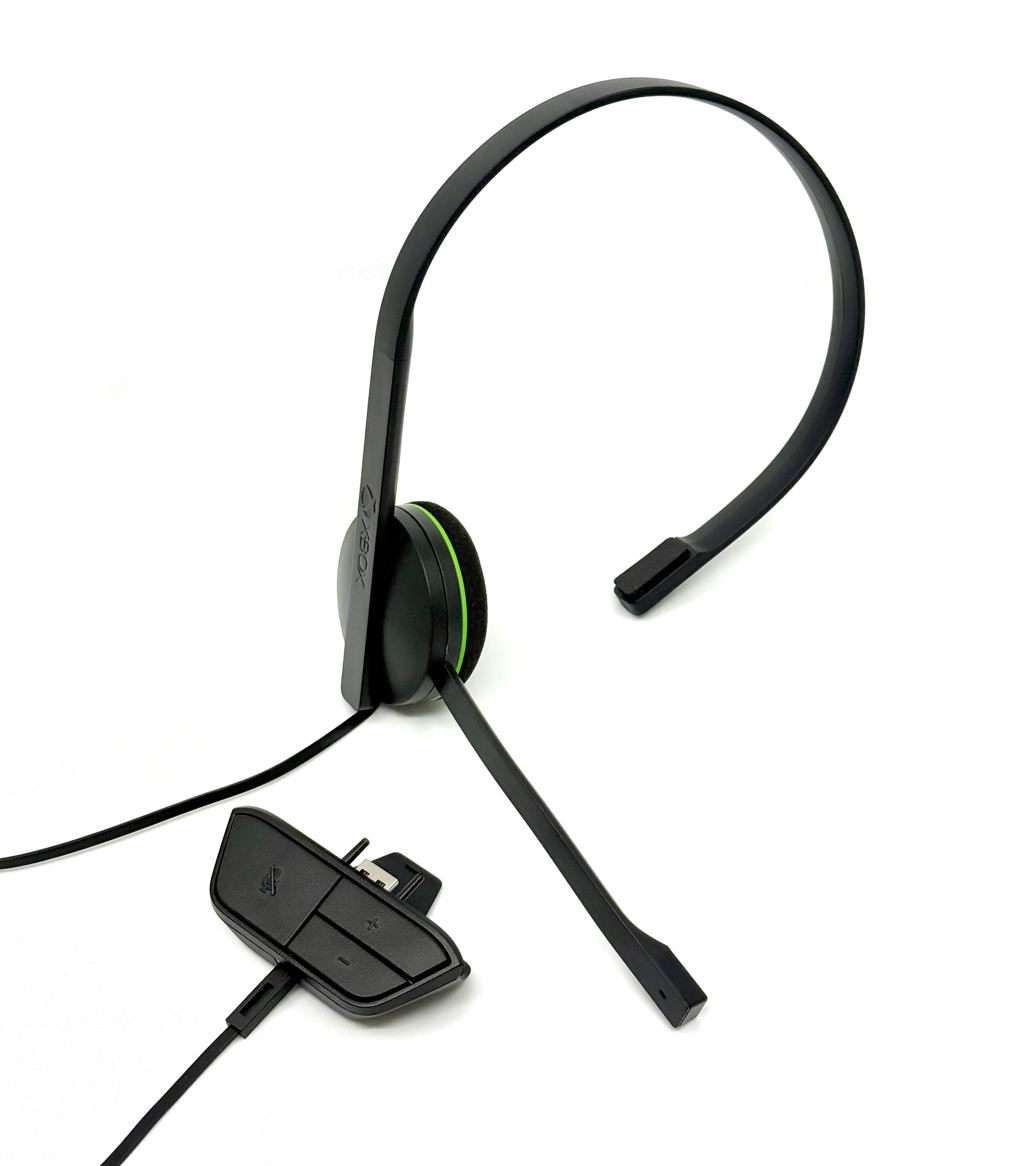
Xbox One Chat Headset (Model 1564)

The Xbox One Wired Chat Headset (model 1564) is a single-ear headset with a boom microphone permanently wired to an adapter that plugs into the rectangular expansion port on the bottom edge of the Xbox One controller; it also engages the two round holes flanking the expansion port with plastic alignment prongs for stability. There are three buttons on the adapter, which allow the player to adjust chat volume and mute the microphone. A version of the Chat Headset was later available with a standard 3.5 mm headphone jack instead of the adapter; on the updated version, the controls were on a small plastic pod inline with the cable.

=== Stereo Headset Adapter ===
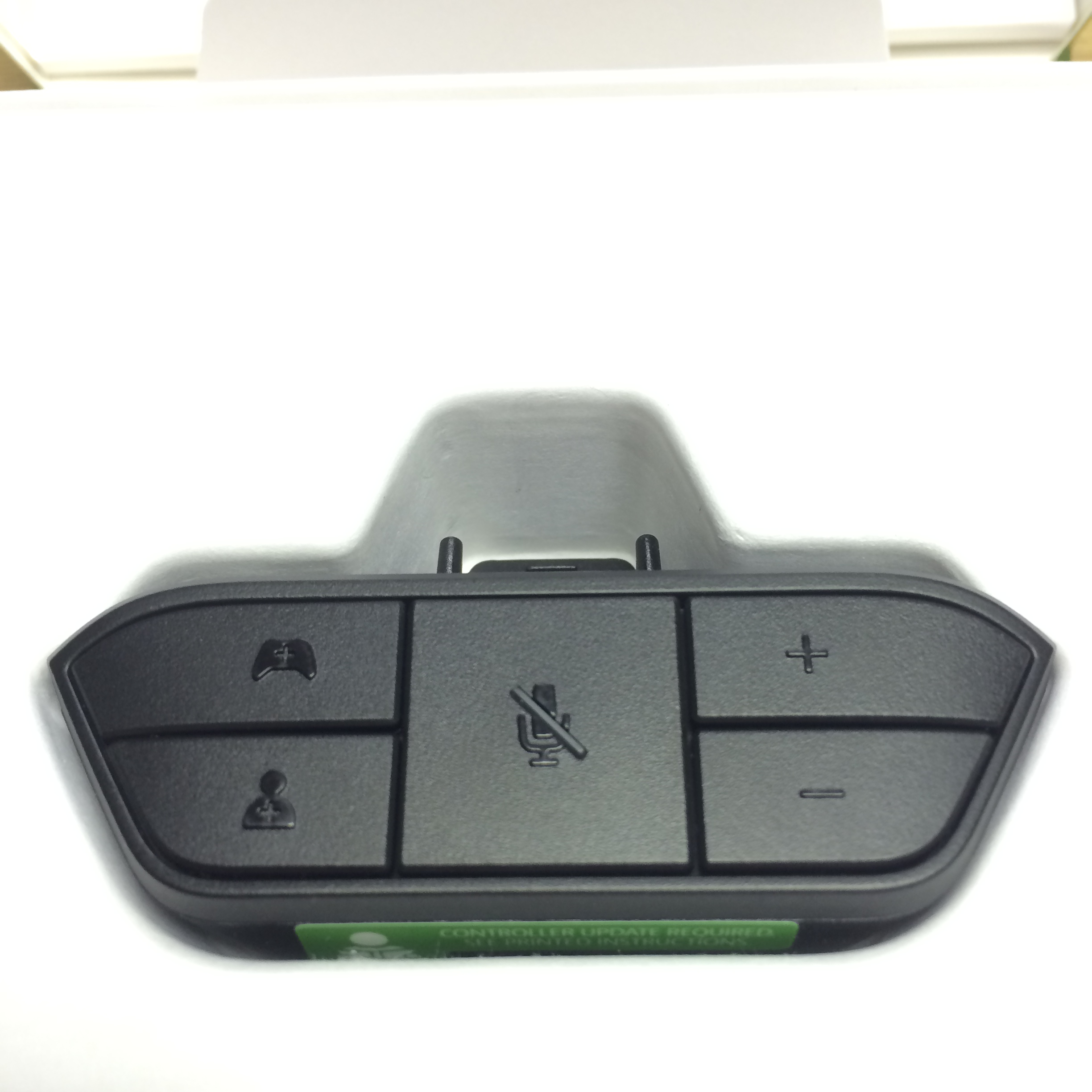
Stereo Headset Adapter (Model 1537)

The original Xbox One Wireless Controller (model 1537) has no 3.5 millimeter headset jack on the bottom edge of the controller. The Xbox One Stereo Headset Adapter (model 1626) allows the use of stereo headsets with 3.5 millimeter headphone jacks using the rectangular expansion port on the bottom center of all Microsoft Xbox One controllers, including the original (model 1537). The Stereo Headset Adapter includes five buttons which allow the player to balance chat and in-game audio output levels, adjust overall volume, and mute the chat microphone. It was available both separately and in a bundle with the Xbox One Stereo Headset (model 1610).

=== Chatpad ===
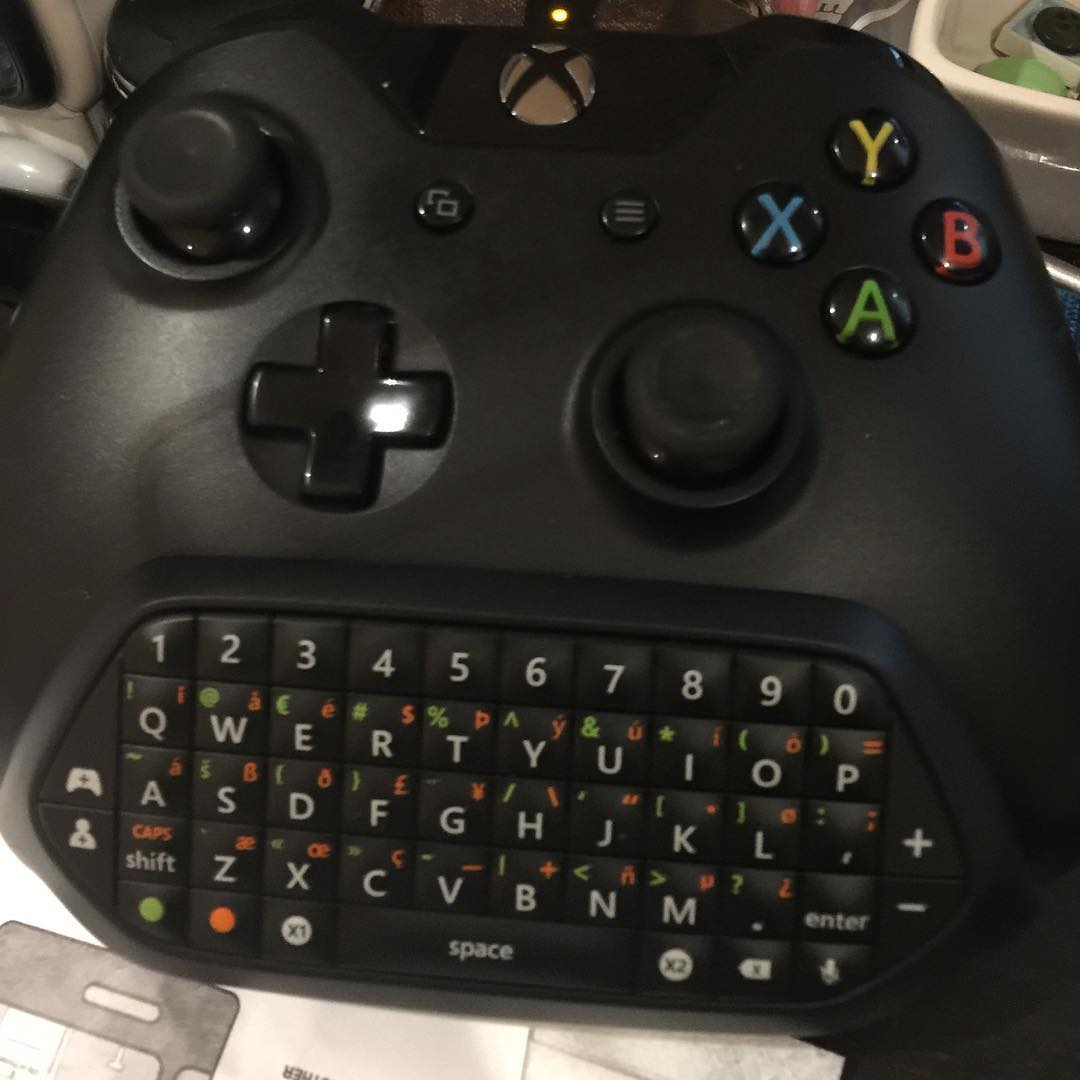
Chatpad (Model 1676) attached to a controller

The Microsoft Chatpad keyboard attachment (model 1676), similar to the Xbox 360 Messenger Kit, was unveiled at Gamescom on August 4, 2015. The Chatpad also includes the functions of the Stereo Headset Adapter and was bundled with the updated version of the Chat Headset terminating in a 3.5 mm headphone jack. In addition, the Chatpad features two dedicated programmable keys; the default behavior allowed the player to record screenshots (X1) and gameplay clips (X2) without using a software menu, if that functionality is enabled in the Xbox Dashboard settings.

=== Play and Charge Kit ===
Similar to the Xbox 360 version, the Play and Charge Kit (model 1556/1727) is the official rechargeable battery pack for Xbox One controllers; it includes both the battery, which is installed in the existing battery compartment, and a charging cable, which allows players to charge the controller while playing a game. The cable is a standard USB-A to micro-USB cable 9 ft (2.7 m) long, equipped with an indicator light that provides state of charge information, glowing orange while charging and green or white when complete. The bundled Xbox One Li-Ion Rechargeable Battery has a 1400 mAh capacity at 3.0 V (4.2 Wh).

The Play and Charge Kit was renamed to the Xbox Rechargeable Battery + USB-C Cable and released for the 2020 revision of the controller (model 1914). The rechargeable battery pack is physically identical to the older version, and the update to the kit is limited to the bundled cable, which is now a 9 ft (2.7 m) USB-A to USB-C cable instead of micro USB. The updated cable has no indicator light.

=== Xbox Wireless Adapter for Windows ===
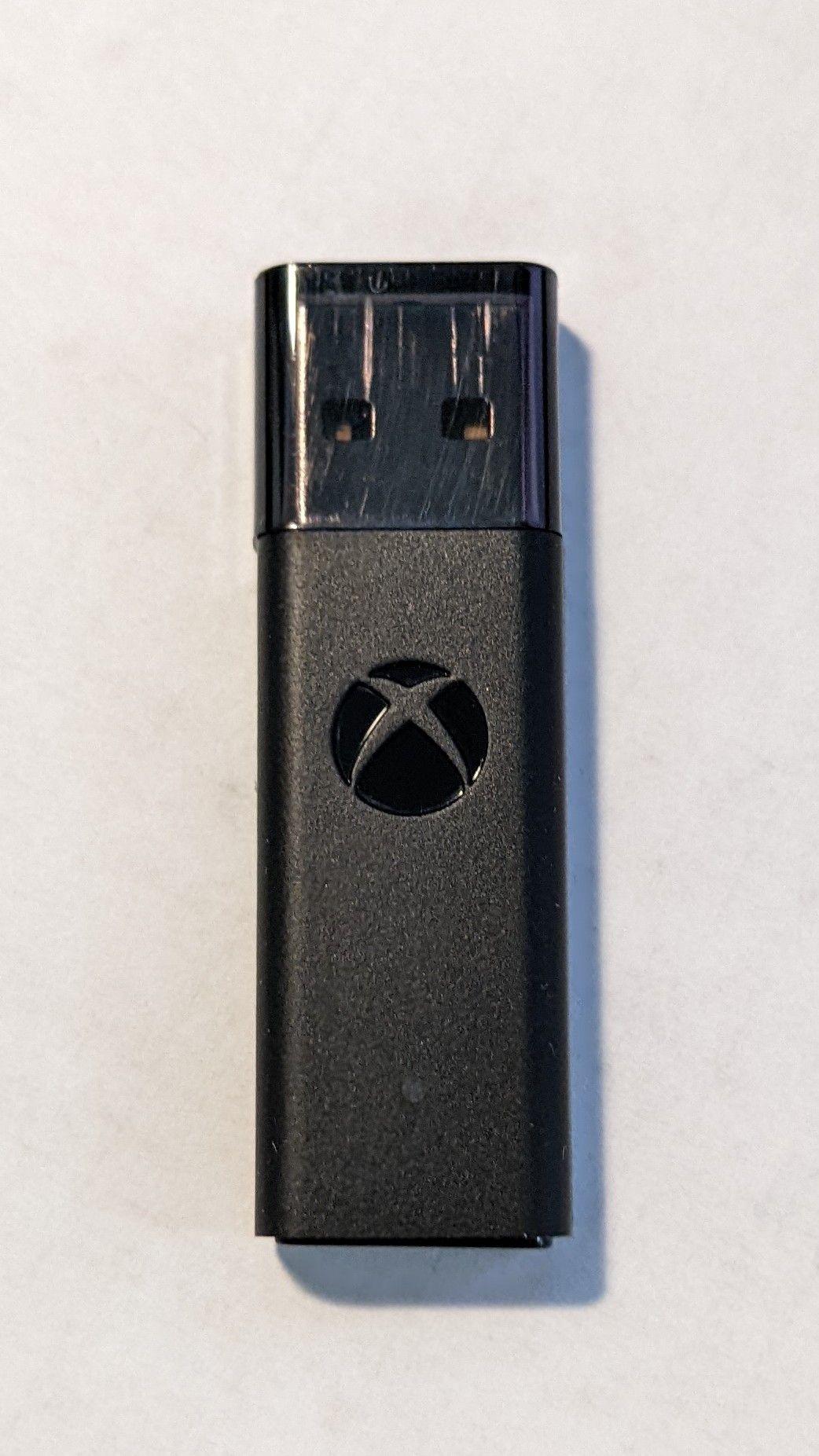
Xbox Wireless Adapter for Windows 10 (Model 1790)

The Xbox Wireless Adapter for Windows (model 1713) is a USB-A dongle with a single button that allows computers using the Windows 10 and Windows 11 operating systems to connect with Xbox controllers, headsets, and similar accessories via the proprietary Xbox Wireless protocol rather than Bluetooth. It was announced in June 2015 and began shipping in October of that year. Support for Windows 7 and 8.1 was added through new drivers in December 2015. It is equipped with a single white LED to indicate pairing and wireless connection status.

A revised version, now named the Xbox Wireless Adapter for Windows 10 (model 1790) was introduced in August 2017 with a smaller size, reducing the risk of obstructing adjacent USB ports. The revised model 1790 drops support for Windows 7 and 8.1.

== See also ==
- Microsoft SideWinder
- Xbox controller
- Xbox 360 controller
