= Oculus Touch =

Motion controller system

Oculus Touch is a line of motion controller systems used by Meta Platforms (formerly Oculus) virtual reality headsets. The controller was first introduced in 2016 as a standalone accessory for the Oculus Rift CV1, and began to be bundled with the headset and all future Oculus products beginning in July 2017. Since their original release, Touch controllers have undergone revisions for later generations of Oculus/Meta hardware, including a switch to inside-out tracking and other design changes.

== Hardware ==
Oculus Touch consists of a pair of handheld units, each featuring an analog stick, three buttons, and two triggers, (one commonly used for grabbing and the other for shooting or firing), along with the first and third iterations having a dedicated thumbrest. and features a system for detecting finger gestures the user may make while holding them. The ring in each controller contains a set of infrared LEDs, which allows them to be fully tracked in 3D space by sensors (either external, or located in the face of the headset on later models), allowing them to be represented in the virtual environment.

== Models ==
=== Oculus Rift CV1 (1st generation) ===
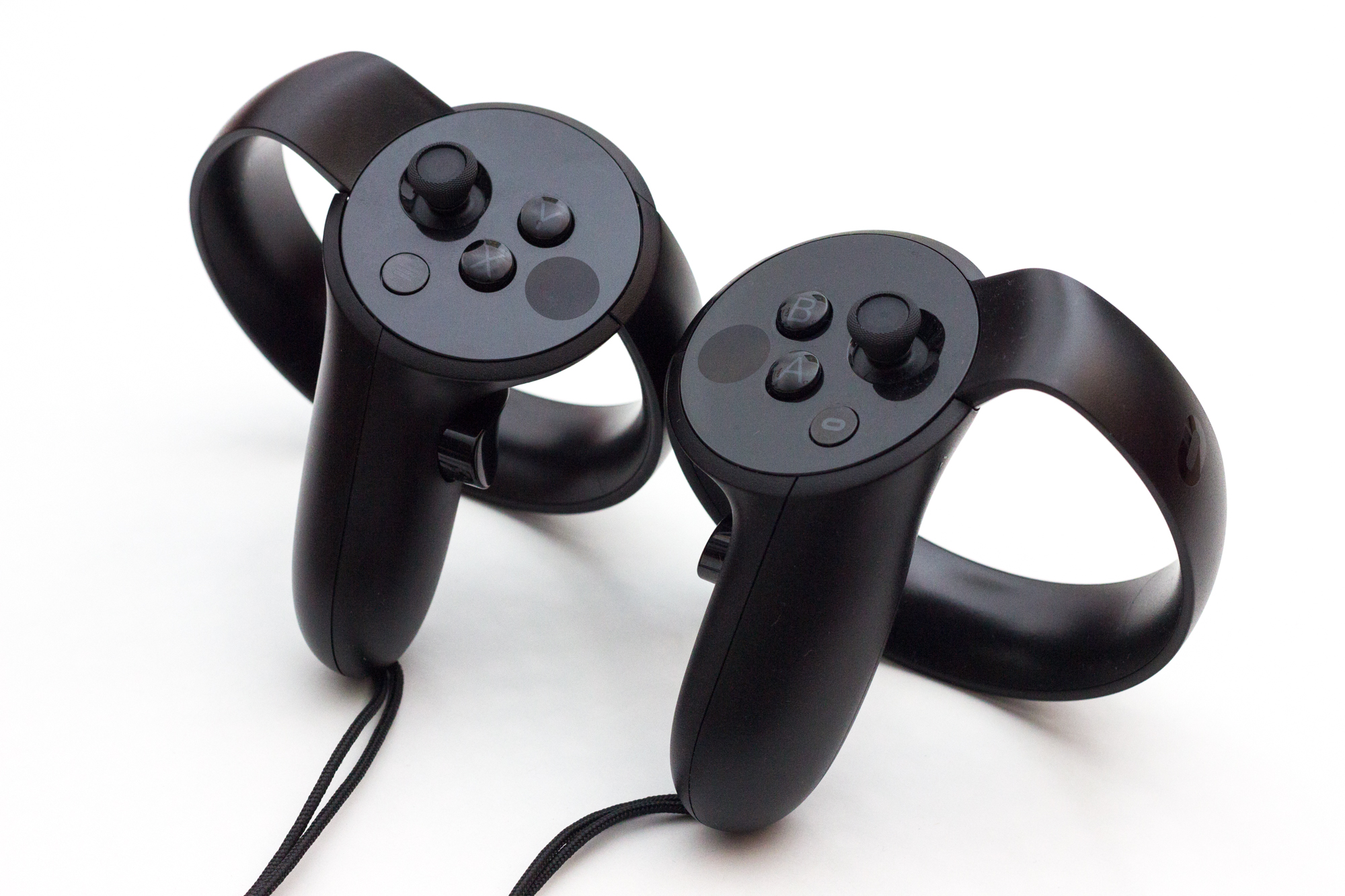
Oculus Touch controllers for the Oculus Rift CV1

The first iteration of Oculus Touch was revealed on June 11, 2015, with a prototype called the Half Moon. The prototype used the same infrared LED tracking technology as the Oculus Rift and included inward-facing sensors which could detect common hand gestures.

Since the Oculus Rift CV1 was initially shipped without motion controllers, Oculus Touch was first released as a standalone accessory for the device. Pre-orders for Oculus Touch began on October 10, 2016, for a release on December 6 at a price of US$200, with priority granted until October 27 to those who had originally pre-ordered the Oculus Rift. In March 2017, their price were lowered to $99. In July 2017, Oculus began to bundle Oculus Touch with Oculus Rift headsets, replacing their previous inclusion of a limited remote control and Xbox Wireless Controller.

=== Oculus Rift S and Quest (2nd generation) ===
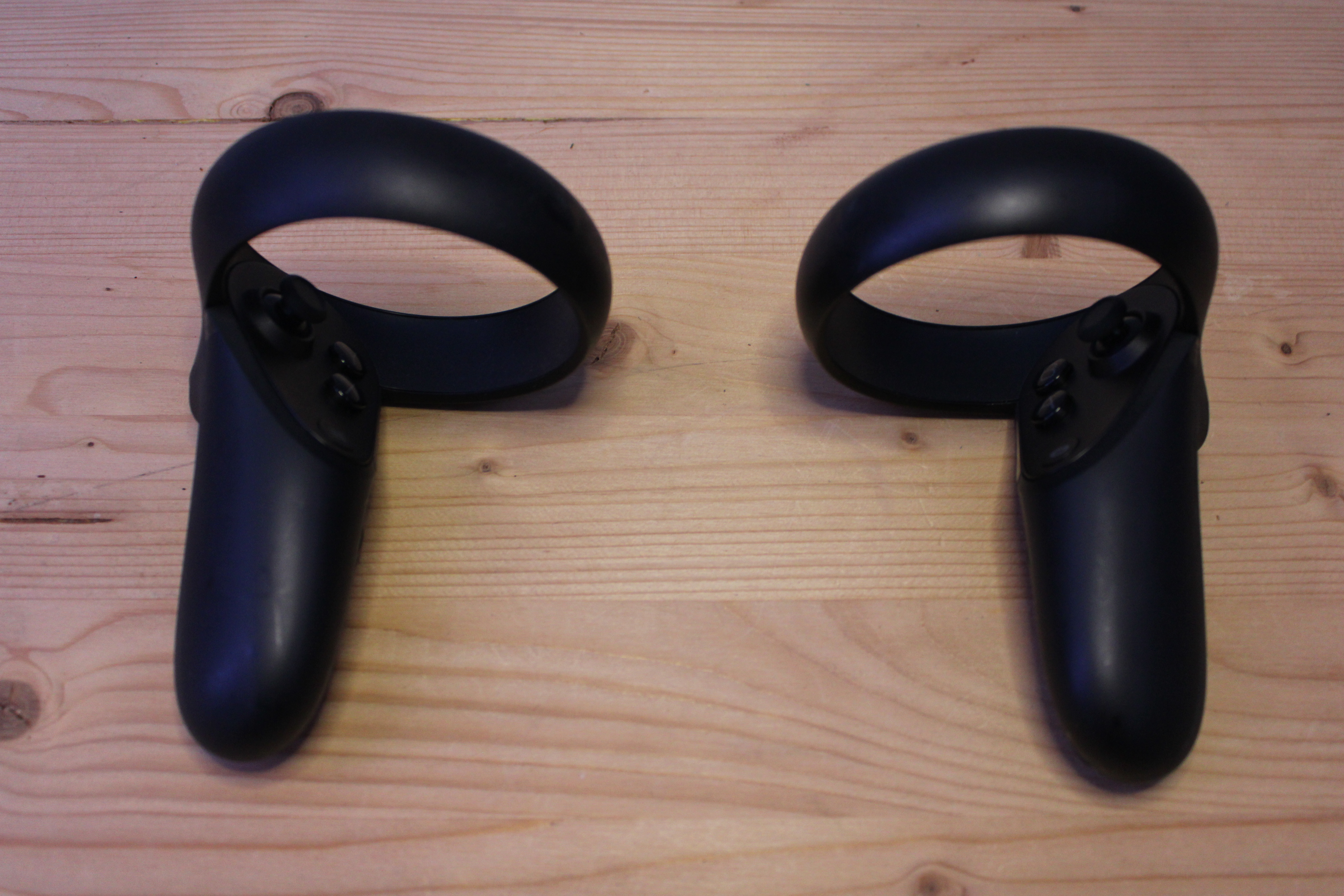
Oculus 2nd Generation Touch Controllers

A second iteration of Oculus Touch was introduced with the Oculus Rift S and Oculus Quest on the 21st of May, 2019. The most prominent modification was that the controllers’ infrared tracking rings were moved to the top of the device facing the user, as they were tracked via cameras embedded in the headset as part of the Oculus Insight inside-out tracking system. This removed the need for external Constellation sensors.

=== Quest 2 (3rd generation) ===
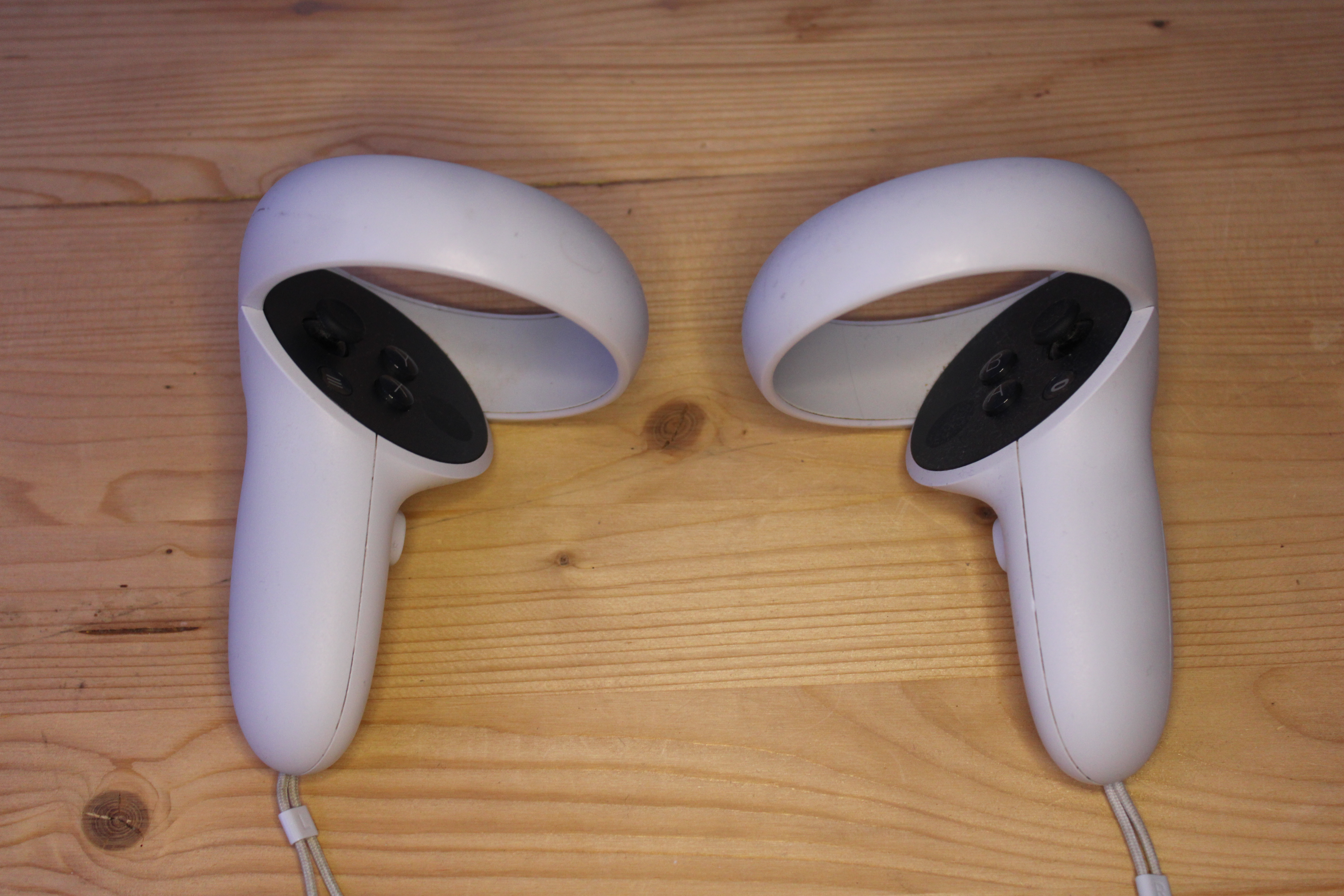
Oculus 3rd Generation Touch

The Meta/Oculus Quest 2 is bundled with a revision to the third-generation Oculus Touch controllers; they feature updated ergonomics influenced by the first-generation controllers (including reinstating the thumb rest), improved haptics, and improved battery life. They also replace the magnetic battery cover with a snap-on cover to prevent the cover from randomly slipping off during intense gameplay.

=== Quest Pro (Touch Pro/4th generation) ===
The fourth iteration of Oculus Touch—branded as Touch Pro—was unveiled in October 2022. They are included with the Meta Quest Pro and sold as an optional accessory for Quest 2 and later. Touch Pro controllers have an on-board tracking system utilizing Qualcomm Snapdragon 662 system-on-chips and integrated cameras, which removes the need for the controllers to be within the headset's line of sight for the best accuracy and performance. These changes also allow the controllers to have a more compact form factor with no sensor rings. The controllers also have a pressure sensor designed to detect pinching gestures, a haptic feedback system known as "TruTouch," and use rechargeable batteries.

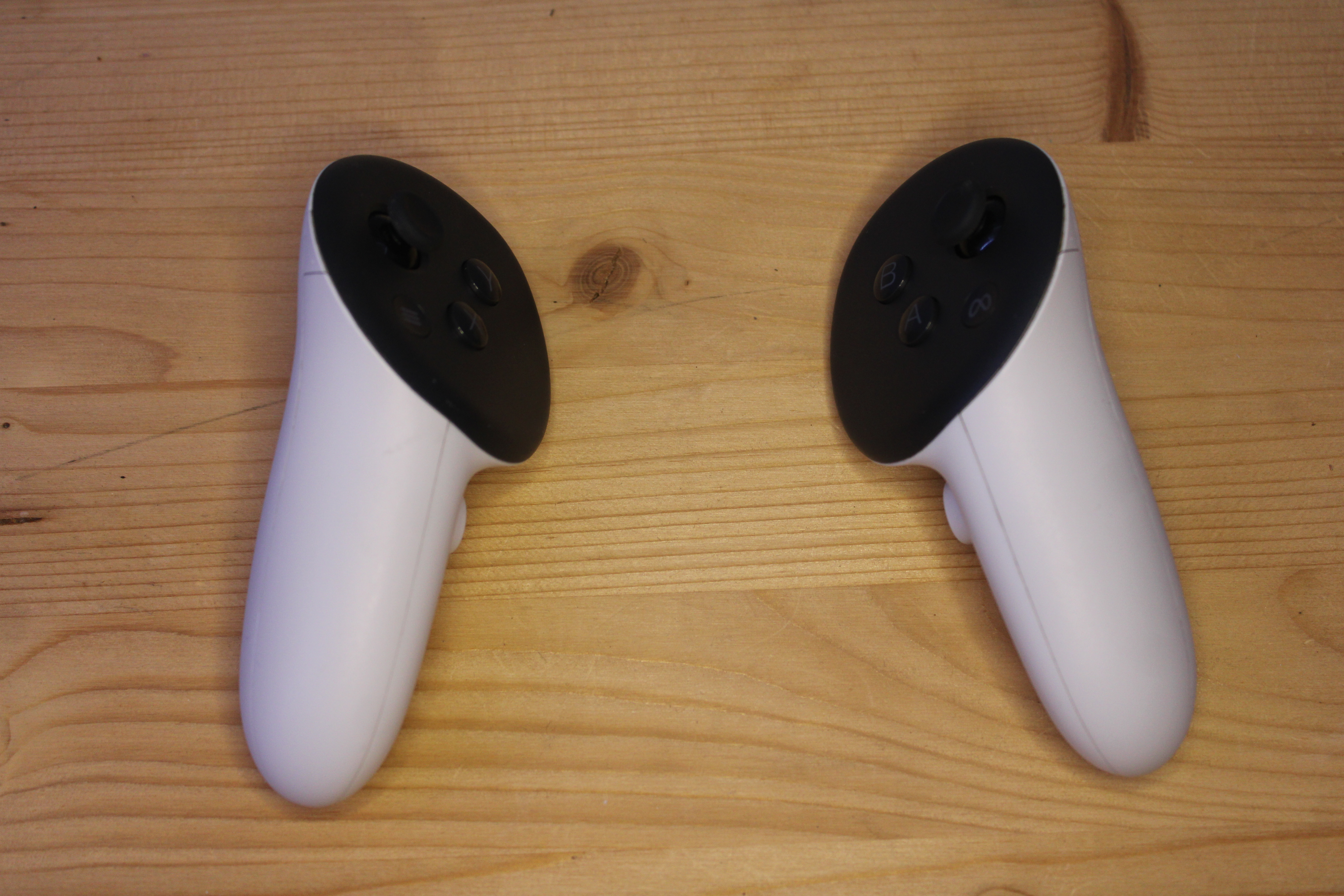
Oculus 5th Generation Touch

=== Quest 3 and Quest 3S (Touch Plus/5th generation) ===
Meta Quest 3 and Quest 3S ship with Touch Plus controllers. Their design are similar to the Touch Pro controllers, but still use infrared emitters for positional tracking—re-located from a sensor ring to the body of the controller, and augmented by internal sensors and the headset's hand tracking system.
