= VirtualRealPorn =

Virtual reality company

- Available in: English
- Founded: 2013
- Headquarters: Spain
- Owner: Mike Kowalski
- Founder: Mike Kowalski
- Industry: Virtual reality
- Employees: 20
- Website: virtualrealporn.com
- Current status: Active

VirtualRealPorn is a virtual reality pornography production company, founded in 2013. The company's headquarters are located in Zaragoza, Spain, with additional offices in Granada and Barcelona, as well as a US office in Ohio where most of the videos are filmed. The company is notable for producing some of the first virtual reality pornographic films.

== History ==
VirtualRealPorn was founded in 2013. The company's productions include virtual reality videos that can be viewed using virtual reality headsets or mobile phones.

In 2015, VirtualRealPorn collaborated with the Dutch company Kiiroo and the Chinese company Lovense to synchronize their remote sex toys with the virtual reality video content.

== VRLove ==
Since 2017, VirtualRealPorn has supported the ongoing development of VRLove, an online multiplayer video game featuring 3D pornographic video content.

== Reception ==
In 2017, VirtualRealPorn was named the best virtual reality porn site by The Daily Dot.

== Web traffic ==
As of July 2021, VirtualRealPorn has a web traffic ranking of 362,631.
