= BaDoinkVR =

American pornography production company

- Available in: English
- Headquarters: United States
- Industry: Virtual reality
- Parent: Badoink Studios
- Website: badoinkvr.com
- Current status: Active

BaDoinkVR is a virtual reality pornography production company founded in 2006. BadoinkVR is the main studio under the Badoink Studios umbrella, which includes BaDoink VIP, VRCosplayX, 18VR, RealVR, and BabeVR. BaDoinkVR is headquartered in Rochester, New York with satellite offices in Barcelona, Silicon Valley, and Los Angeles. The company and its content have won various accolades at AVN, Pornhub, XBIZ, and the Free Speech Coalition.

== History ==
Founded in 2006, BaDoink was initially launched as a premium online adult entertainment site with a proprietary technology platform. In 2015, the company expanded its platform and content production to focus on virtual reality with the launch of BaDoinkVR.

The company was the first to drive mass consumer trial of VR adult videos by seeding the market with 20,000 free virtual reality cardboard goggles, an initiative to popularize adult virtual reality content.

In 2024, the studio opened their first studio dedicated to adult content in Augmented Reality, releasing original and remastered 8K content through the PassthroughVR studio, including scenes from VRCosplayX.

== Products and technology ==
=== Platform ===
Sites under the Badoink Studios banner work in conjunction with Prism VR Player, which can be downloaded on any Meta Quest device, and includes augmented reality enabling passthrough technology.

The website features 360 and 180-degree immersive videos, motion tracking and binaural audio. The content is available on a variety of VR devices, as well as smartphones using BaDoink's VR Player.

=== Video resolutions ===
The first videos launched by the company were in 4K resolution. As the industry developed, BaDoinkVR produced higher resolution 5K, 6K, and 7K videos. As of 2021, all content on the network was filmed and released in 8K resolution.

== Haptic technology and interactivity ==
In February 2016, BaDoinkVR announced a partnership with Amsterdam based sex-technology manufacturer KIIROO, who have been developing sex toys embedded with manufacturer of haptic technology, also known as teledildonics. This collaboration between allowed viewers to sync their KIIROO devices to adult VR videos in real-time.

Their sex toys, like KIIROO Keon or KIIROO Pulse, are able to connect remotely using an internet connection, which allows the paired devices to send haptic feedback to one another through kinaesthetic movements, vibrations and pulsations. The two-way flow of remote connection and haptic touch feedback facilitates the simulation of sexual relations over a distance. The two companies have also worked together on collaborative projects producing virtual reality videos focusing on sex education and virtual sexology. In the VR film, actors guide viewers through solo masturbation techniques using sex-technology and guidance from therapists. Their collaborative video was one of the first efforts to combine both sexology, sexual therapy and virtual reality into accessible and affordable media outlets.

The studio produces original funscripts. As of 2026, they are the first virtual reality site to offer their complete funscript library at no extra cost to subscribers, to be used in conjunction with haptic devices. Funscripts are files that allow recreational haptic devices, capable of connecting Badoink’s servers or a bluetooth integration, to move in sync with the action in the video, with the aim of heightening immersion.

== Malware claims ==
In May 2015, BaDoink was notified that the brand and logo, disguised as the BaDoink Ultra App, were being used to spread the Reveton/IcePol ransomware. They identified the site that was distributing the ransomware, and proceeded to remedy the situation, alerting the site's hosting company, and submitting a DMCA takedown request. The company was also in contact with the FBI Cyber Division and sent a cease and desist to the owners of the domain names as well.

== Awards ==
- 2016 Internet Company of the Year - Free Speech Coalition
- 2016 Adult Site of the Year: Virtual Reality - XBIZ Award
- 2018 VR Site of the Year - AVN Awards
- 2018 Most Popular VR Site - Pornhub Awards
- 2022 Best Virtual Reality Scene - Star Wars, The Mandalorian, Alexis Tae, AVN Awards
- 2024 Best Virtual Reality Scene - Dante’s Inferno, Blake Blossom, AVN Awards
- 2026 Best Virtual Reality Cosplay Scene - Severance, Siri Dahl, XBiz Awards
