= Matthew Mercer filmography =

Filmography of American voice actor

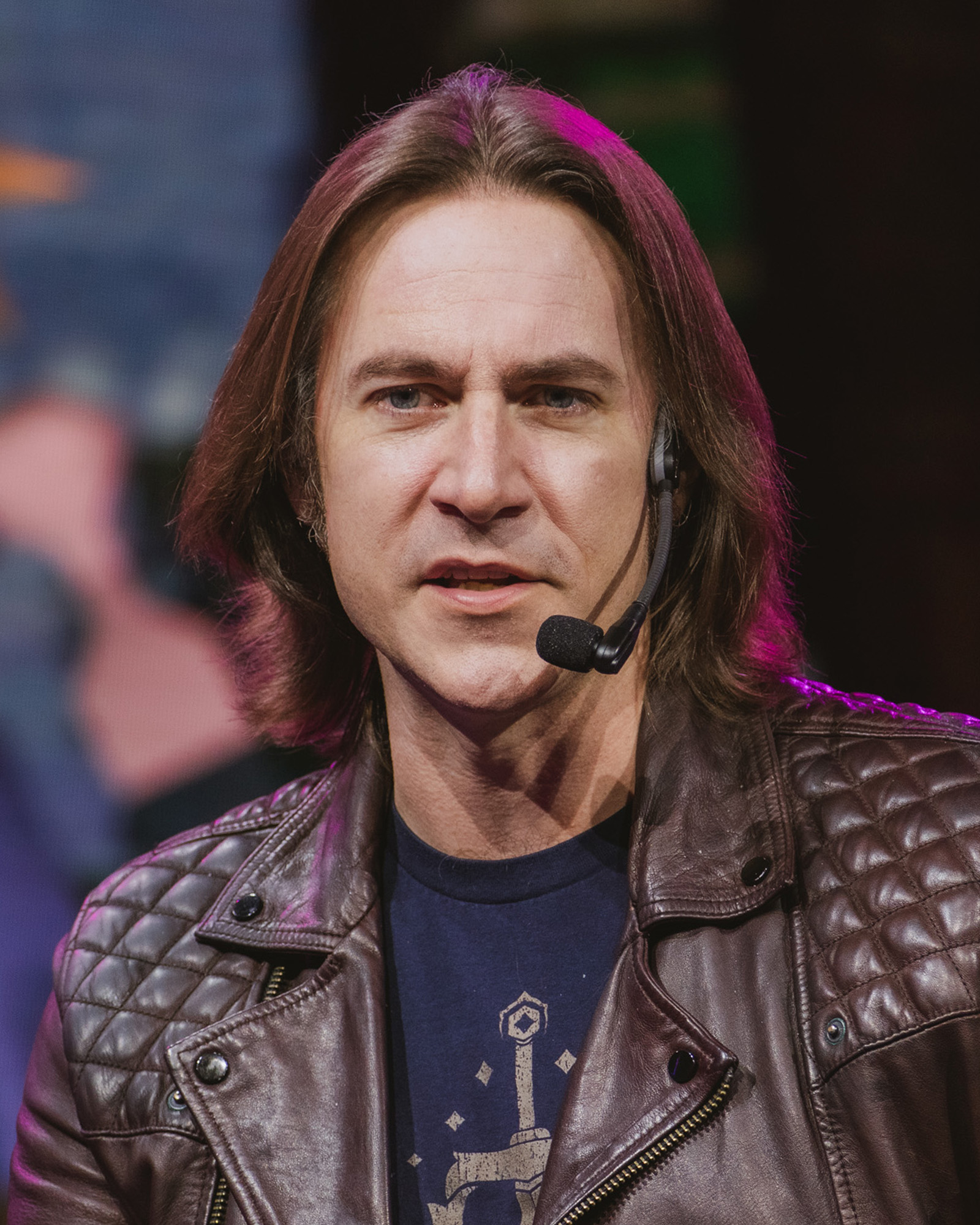
Mercer speaking at IGN Live in 2024.

Matthew Mercer is an American voice actor, game designer, gamemaster and singer. He has been a voice-over artist in video games and animation since 2002. Mercer began his voice acting career performing English walla and additional characters in several Japanese anime, and has since also worked in cartoons, video games, and radio commercials. He has also performed in live action roles, such as actual play web series featuring various tabletop roleplaying games.

== Voice acting ==
=== Anime ===
List of voice performances in anime
Year	Title	Role	Notes	Source
2012	Nura: Rise of the Yokai Clan – Demon Capital	Rihan Nura		
2013	Persona 4: The Animation	Kanji Tatsumi	Replaces Troy Baker (episode 13 onwards)	
2013	Fate/Zero	Kiritsugu Emiya		
2013	K	Kuroh Yatogami		
2013	Digimon Fusion	Reapmon, Beelzemon, Omnimon, others		
2014	Magi: The Labyrinth of Magic	Sinbad		
2014	Gargantia on the Verdurous Planet	Chamber		
2014	Rock Lee & His Ninja Pals	Might Guy		
2014	Bleach	Shukuro Tsukishima		
2014–15	Kill la Kill	Aikuro Mikisugi	Also OVA	
2014–18	Naruto: Shippuden	Yamato, others	Replaces Troy Baker (episode 230 onwards)	
2014–20	Sword Art Online	Seijirou Kikuoka	Seasons 2–3	
2014–24	Attack on Titan	Levi Ackerman		
2015	Sailor Moon	Prince Demande	Viz Media dub	
2015	Fate/stay night: Unlimited Blade Works	Kiritsugu Emiya	Television series	
2015	Attack on Titan: Junior High	Levi Ackerman		
2015	Sailor Moon Crystal	Prince Demande		
2015	Daimidaler the Sound Robot	Kouichi		
2015–16	Aldnoah.Zero	Koichiro Marito		
2015–present	One Piece	Trafalgar Law, Binz	Funimation dub	
2016	Brothers Conflict	Yusuke Asahina		
2016	Black Butler: Book of Circus	Joker		
2016	Fairy Tail	Silver Fullbuster		
2016	Sengoku Basara: End of Judgement	Mitsunari Ishida		
2016–19	Hunter × Hunter	Leorio Paradinight	2011 series	
2016–23	Bungo Stray Dogs	Nathaniel Hawthorne		
2017–19	Dragon Ball Super	Hit	Funimation dub	
2017–22	JoJo's Bizarre Adventure	Jotaro Kujo	Starting from Stardust Crusaders (Note: The first three episodes of the English dub for Stardust Crusaders were limited streamed in July 2014 for Anime Expo)	
2019–20	Boruto: Naruto Next Generations	Yamato		
2019–23	Ultraman	Narrator, Bemular, others	Netflix series	
2019–24	Demon Slayer: Kimetsu no Yaiba	Kagaya Ubuyashiki		
2020	Ghost in the Shell: SAC 2045	Nameless, Agents, US Embassy Staffer	Netflix series	
2020	Persona 5: The Animation	Yusuke Kitagawa		
2021	Fruits Basket	God	Season 3	
2022	Cyberpunk: Edgerunners	Falco	Netflix series	
2025–present	Sakamoto Days	Taro Sakamoto	Netflix series	
2026	Baki-Dou: The Invincible Samurai	Kinichi Tanaka, Tranp	Netflix series	
2026	Bleach: Thousand-Year Blood War	Shukuro Tsukishima		

=== Animation ===
Key
†	Denotes television productions that have not yet been released

List of voice performances in animation
Year	Title	Role	Notes	Source
2011–12	ThunderCats	Tygra		
2013	Beware the Batman	Ice Pick Joe		
2015	DC Super Friends	Clark Kent / Superman, Harvey Dent / Two-Face		
2015–20	Wabbit	Bigfoot		
2016–17	Regular Show	Chance Sureshot, Recap Robot, others		
2017	Marvel's Spider-Man	Aleksei Sytsevich / Rhino, others		
2017	Zak Storm	Golden Bones		Tweet
2017	Freedom Fighters: The Ray	Black Arrow, Doll Man, Oliver Queen / Green Arrow	Web series	
2017–19	Avengers Assemble	Hercules, Tiger Shark, others		
2018	Voltron: Legendary Defender	Lieutenant Hepta		Tweet
2020	Chico Bon Bon: Monkey with a Tool Belt	Additional voices		
2020	Robot Chicken	Scott Lang / Ant-Man, Arthur Curry / Aquaman		
2020–25	Blood of Zeus	Hermes		Tweet
2022	Dragon Age: Absolution	Fairbanks		
2022–present	The Legend of Vox Machina	Trinket, Sylas Briarwood, Orthax, Craven Edge, Umbrasyl, Dr. Dranzel, Artagan, Doty, others	Executive producer	
2024	Lego Monkie Kid	Nine-Headed Demon		Tweet
2025	Tomb Raider: The Legend of Lara Croft	Chartreuse	Season 2	
2025–present	The Mighty Nein	Essek Thelyss, Uk'otoa, Bludd, Dain, Pumat Sol, Artagan, others	Executive producer	

=== Films ===
List of English dubbing performances in feature films
Year	Title	Role	Notes	Source
2012	Fullmetal Alchemist: The Sacred Star of Milos	Melvin Voyager	Limited theatrical release for English dub	
2012	Resident Evil: Damnation	Leon S. Kennedy		
2017	Resident Evil: Vendetta	Leon S. Kennedy	Limited theatrical release	
2017	Sword Art Online The Movie: Ordinal Scale	Seijirō Kikuoka		
2019	Promare	Gueira	Limited theatrical release	
2019	One Piece: Stampede	Trafalgar Law	Limited theatrical release	
2022	One Piece Film: Red	Trafalgar Law	Limited theatrical release	
2023	Resident Evil: Death Island	Leon S. Kennedy	Limited theatrical release	

List of voice and dubbing performances in direct-to-video and television films
Year	Title	Role	Notes	Source
2013	Iron Man: Rise of Technovore	Tony Stark / Iron Man		
2013	Leo the Lion	Maximus Elephante		
2014	Justice League: War	Guard		
2014	Naruto Shippuden the Movie: Blood Prison	Mui		
2014	Avengers Confidential: Black Widow & Punisher	Tony Stark / Iron Man		
2014	One Piece Film: Z	Bins		
2015	Tiger & Bunny: The Rising	Richard Max		
2015	Batman Unlimited: Animal Instincts	Mech Guard 1, Wealthy Jock		
2015	Marvel Super Hero Adventures: Frost Fight!	Steve Rogers / Captain America, Gingerbread Men		
2016	Batman: Bad Blood	Hellhound, Chuckie Sol		
2017	K: Missing Kings	Kuroh Yatogami		
2021	Demon Slayer: Kimetsu no Yaiba – The Movie: Mugen Train	Kagaya Ubuyashiki		
2021	Justice Society: World War II	Hourman		
2021	Mortal Kombat Legends: Battle of the Realms	Kurtis Stryker, Smoke		
2021	Seal Team	Dave, Shark		
2023	Mortal Kombat Legends: Cage Match	Ethan, Bully		
2026	The Last Fifteen Minutes	Announcer	Short film	

=== Video games ===
List of voice and dubbing performances in video games
Year	Title	Role	Notes	Source
2002	Pryzm Chapter One: The Dark Unicorn	Zartu / Dark Unicorn, various characters		
2004	Scaler	Scaler		
2004	Ace Combat 5: The Unsung War	Albert Genette		
2008	Final Fantasy Fables: Chocobo's Dungeon	Treasure Hunter Cid		
2008	Rise of the Argonauts	Phaiden		
2008	World of Warcraft: Wrath of the Lich King	General Vezax, Halion		
2009	Street Fighter IV	Fei Long		
2009	Star Ocean: The Last Hope	Edge Maverick		
2009	Eat Lead: The Return of Matt Hazard	Dockworker, Elite Commander, Employee Tester		
2009	Wolfenstein	Erik Engle		
2009	Brütal Legend	Gravedigger		
2009	Final Fantasy Crystal Chronicles: The Crystal Bearers	Blaze		
2010	No More Heroes 2: Desperate Struggle	Skelter Helter, Bishop Shidax		
2010	Super Street Fighter IV	Fei Long		
2010	Metal Gear Solid: Peace Walker	Soldiers		
2010	Sengoku Basara: Samurai Heroes	Maeda Keiji		
2010	Fist of the North Star: Ken's Rage	Rei		
2011	Mortal Kombat	Kurtis Stryker		
2011	Rune Factory: Tides of Destiny	James		
2012	Soulcalibur V	Z.W.E.I.		
2012	Guild Wars 2	Male Norn Player, Arkk, others		
2012	Dead or Alive 5	Bayman		
2012	Resident Evil 6	Leon S. Kennedy		
2012	Professor Layton and the Miracle Mask	Henry Ledore		
2012	World of Warcraft: Mists of Pandaria	Captain Drok		
2013	Fire Emblem Awakening	Chrom		
2013	Aliens: Colonial Marines	Keyes		
2013	Gears of War: Judgment	Pilot, Onyx Soldier, PA Officer		
2013	Shin Megami Tensei IV	Walter		
2013	Tales of Xillia	Alvin		
2013	Rune Factory 4	Leon		
2013	Batman: Arkham Origins	Anarky		
2013	Knack	Gundahar		
2013	République	Prizrak		
2014	Hearthstone	Rexxar, others		
2014	Metal Gear Solid V: Ground Zeroes	The Eye, Prisoner 12282, soldiers/extras		
2014	Destiny	Guardian (human male)	Also motion capture	
2014	Persona 4 Arena Ultimax	Kanji Tatsumi		
2014	Tenkai Knights: Brave Battle	Guardian Zephyrus		
2014	World of Warcraft: Warlords of Draenor	Kilrogg Deadeye		
2014	Persona Q: Shadow of the Labyrinth	Kanji Tatsumi		
2014	Guilty Gear Xrd -SIGN-	Zato-1		
2015	Saints Row: Gat out of Hell	Gallows Dodger, Demons, Blackbeard		
2015	Evolve	Abe		
2015	Final Fantasy Type-0 HD	Trey		
2015	Pillars of Eternity	Edér, Aloth, player voice (male sinister), others		
2015	Batman: Arkham Knight	Tim Drake / Robin		
2015	League of Legends	Gangplank, Kindred (Wolf)		
2015	Danganronpa Another Episode: Ultra Despair Girls	Haiji Towa		
2015	Persona 4: Dancing All Night	Kanji Tatsumi		
2015	Minecraft: Story Mode	Aiden, Otis, TNT Dustin, The Old Farmer, others		
2015	Fallout 4	MacCready, Mr. Sumner, Z1-14		
2015	Stella Glow	Klaus		
2015	Xenoblade Chronicles X	Lao		
2015	The Legend of Heroes: Trails of Cold Steel	Olivert Reise Arnor		
2015	Disney Infinity 3.0	Wedge Antilles		
2016	Naruto Shippuden: Ultimate Ninja Storm 4	Pain, Eight-Tails (Gyuki)		
2016	Seven Knights	Kris		
2016	Fire Emblem Fates	Ryoma, Shigure, Azama		
2016	Mario & Sonic at the Rio 2016 Olympic Games	Espio the Chameleon		
2016	Overwatch	Cole Cassidy	Character named Jesse McCree until October 2021	
2016	Mighty No. 9	Mighty No. 1 Pyrogen		
2016	Zero Time Dilemma	Sigma Klim		
2016	The Legend of Heroes: Trails of Cold Steel II	Olivert Reise Arnor		
2016	Masquerada: Songs and Shadows	Cicero Gavar		
2016	Skylanders: Imaginators	Spyro the Dragon		
2016	Titanfall 2	Jack Cooper		
2016	Final Fantasy XV	Cor Leonis		
2017	Kingdom Hearts HD 2.8 Final Chapter Prologue	Ira	Kingdom Hearts χ Back Cover movie	
2017	Fire Emblem Heroes	Ryoma, Chrom, Azama, Shigure		
2017	Nier: Automata	Additional voices		
2017	Club Penguin Island	Rory		
2017	Persona 5	Yusuke Kitagawa		
2017	Puyo Puyo Tetris	Ex		
2017	Injustice 2	Floyd Lawton / Deadshot		
2017	Batman: The Enemy Within	Mr. Freeze, others		
2017	Fire Emblem Warriors	Chrom, Ryoma		
2017	Sonic Forces	Espio the Chameleon		
2017	Star Wars Battlefront II	Luke Skywalker		
2018	Monster Hunter: World	Field Team Leader, Huntsman		
2018	Dragon Ball FighterZ	Hit		
2018	Pillars of Eternity II: Deadfire	Edér, Aloth, Shaun Gilmore	Gilmore via Critical Role Pack DLC	
2018	BlazBlue: Cross Tag Battle	Kanji Tatsumi		
2018	Fortnite: Save the World	Steel Wool Syd		
2018	Naruto to Boruto: Shinobi Striker	Yamato, Pain, Gyūki / Eight-Tails		
2018	Marvel's Spider-Man	Charles Standish		
2018	Lego DC Super-Villains	Voice cast		
2018	Epic Seven	Basar, Corvus, Jecht		
2018	Persona 5: Dancing in Starlight	Yusuke Kitagawa		
2018	Super Smash Bros. Ultimate	Chrom, Yusuke Kitagawa	Yusuke via Joker DLC released in April 2019	
2019	Kingdom Hearts III	Ira		
2019	Judgment	Mitsuru Kuroiwa		
2019	Kill la Kill: If	Aikuro Mikisugi		
2019	Catherine: Full Body	Yusuke Kitagawa	Persona 5 DLC	
2019	Indivisible	Zebei		
2019	The Legend of Heroes: Trails of Cold Steel III	Olivert Reise Arnor		
2019	Mario & Sonic at the Olympic Games Tokyo 2020	Espio the Chameleon		
2019	Death Stranding	The Ludens Fan, Med Voice, Bomb Countdown		
2020	Fortnite Battle Royale	Midas		
2020	Rune Factory 4 Special	Leon		
2020	Sonic at the Olympic Games	Espio the Chameleon	Archive audio	
2020	Persona 5 Royal	Yusuke Kitagawa		
2020	Dragalia Lost	Chrom		
2020	The Last of Us Part II	Prison Leader, additional voices		
2020	The Legend of Heroes: Trails of Cold Steel IV	George Nome, Olivert Reise Arnor		
2020	Yakuza: Like a Dragon	Goro Majima		
2020	Marvel's Iron Man VR	Morgan Stark		
2021	Persona 5 Strikers	Yusuke Kitagawa		
2021	Guilty Gear Strive	Zato-1, Eddie		
2021	Demon Slayer: Kimetsu no Yaiba – The Hinokami Chronicles	Kagaya Ubuyashiki, others		
2022	Phantom Breaker: Omnia	Tokiya Kanzaki		
2022	Return to Monkey Island	Cobb		
2022	Overwatch 2	Cole Cassidy		
2022	Star Ocean: The Divine Force	Raimbaut Aucerius, Luca Maverick		
2022	World of Warcraft: Dragonflight	Fyrakk		
2022	Marvel's Midnight Suns	Hunter (male)		
2023	Fire Emblem Engage	Chrom		
2023	The Legend of Zelda: Tears of the Kingdom	Ganondorf		
2023	The Legend of Heroes: Trails into Reverie	George Nome, Olivert Reise Arnor, additional voices		
2023	Baldur's Gate 3	Minsc	Also motion capture	
2023	Starfield	Ezekiel, others		
2023	Disgaea 7: Vows of the Virtueless	Valvatorez		
2023	Like a Dragon Gaiden: The Man Who Erased His Name	Goro Majima		
2023	Persona 5 Tactica	Yusuke Kitagawa		
2023	Naruto x Boruto: Ultimate Ninja Storm Connections	Yamato, Pain		
2023	Asgard's Wrath 2	Loki		
2024	Like a Dragon: Infinite Wealth	Goro Majima		
2024	Final Fantasy VII Rebirth	Vincent Valentine		
2024	Demon Slayer: Kimetsu no Yaiba – Sweep the Board	Kagaya Ubuyashiki		
2024	Dead by Daylight: Dungeons & Dragons	Vecna		
2024	Vampire Therapist	Reinhard, Ciaran		
2024	Dragon Ball: Sparking! Zero	Hit		
2024	Batman: Arkham Shadow	Anarky, Dillon, Bastien		
2024	Sonic X Shadow Generations	Espio the Chameleon		
2024	Dragon Age: The Veilguard	Viper, Manfred, additional voices		
2025	Phantom Brave: The Lost Hero	Valvatorez, Goat Fighter		
2025	Avowed	Sargamis		
2025	Like a Dragon: Pirate Yakuza in Hawaii	Goro Majima		
2025	Xenoblade Chronicles X: Definitive Edition	Lao		
2025	Yakuza 0 Director's Cut	Goro Majima		
2025	Date Everything!	Chance		
2025	Dead Take	Film Man		
2025	Demon Slayer: Kimetsu no Yaiba – The Hinokami Chronicles 2	Kagaya Ubuyashiki		
2025	Trails in the Sky 1st Chapter	Olivier Lenheim, additional voices		
2025	Sonic Racing: CrossWorlds	Espio the Chameleon		
2025	Ys vs. Trails in the Sky: Alternative Saga	Olivier Lenheim		
2025	Dispatch	Elliot Connors / Shroud		
2025	Hyrule Warriors: Age of Imprisonment	Ganondorf		
2025	Dungeons & Dragons: The Tyrant's Eye	Narrator, various roles	Pinball machine by Stern Pinball	
2025	Marvel Cosmic Invasion	Richard Rider / Nova, Annihilus		
2026	Yakuza Kiwami 3 & Dark Ties	Goro Majima, additional voices		
2026	Shinobi: Art of Vengeance	Goro Majima	Sega Villains Stage DLC	
2026	Ledgerbound	Avarice		
2026	Trails in the Sky 2nd Chapter	Olivier Lenheim		
2026	The Legend of Zelda: Ocarina of Time	Ganondorf		
2026	Marvel Rivals	Kurt Wagner / Nightcrawler		
2026	Warframe †	Brysko	Tau expansion	
2027	Final Fantasy VII Revelation †	Vincent Valentine		
TBA	Witchspire †	Player	Released in early access in June 2026	
TBA	Emberville †	TBA	Early access release set for January 2027	

=== Audio books ===
List of voice and dubbing performances in audio books
Year	Title	Role	Notes	Source
2022	Critical Role: The Mighty Nein – The Nine Eyes of Lucien	Lucien Tavelle, additional voices		
2025	Critical Role: Vox Machina – Stories Untold	Narrator, Shaun Gilmore, Craven Edge		
2026	Critical Role: The Mighty Nein – Stories Untold	Narrator		

=== Audio drama ===
List of voice and dubbing performances in audio dramas
Year	Title	Role	Notes	Source
2026	Sonic the Hedgehog Presents: The Chaotix Casefiles	Espio the Chameleon, Mr. Kitsch	Main role	

=== Live-action dubbing ===
List of dubbing performances in live-action media
Year	Title	Role	Notes	Source
2024	Like a Dragon: Yakuza	Goro Majima	English dub	

== Live-action ==
=== Films ===
List of acting performances in film
Year	Title	Role	Notes	Source
2013	Geek USA	Evan Woodward		
2015	Mythica: The Darkspore	Szorlok	Premiered on CONtv	
2015	Mythica: The Necromancer	Szorlok	Premiered on CONtv	
2016	Mythica: The Iron Crown	Szorlok	Funded through Kickstarter	
2016	Mythica: The Godslayer	Szorlok		
2024	Mythica: Stormbound	Szorlok	Funded through Kickstarter	

=== Web series ===
List of appearances in web shows and series
Year	Title	Role	Notes	Source
2009	There Will Be Brawl	Ganondorf, Kirby, Meta Knight	Also director and co-creator Hosted on The Escapist website	
2015–present	Critical Role	Dungeon Master (campaign 1)	Cast member, creator, and producer; creator-owned actual play web series	
2015–present	Critical Role	Dungeon Master (campaign 2)	Cast member, creator, and producer; creator-owned actual play web series	
2015–present	Critical Role	Dungeon Master, Dariax Zaveon (campaign 3)	Cast member, creator, and producer; creator-owned actual play web series	
2015–present	Critical Role	Sir Julien Davinos (campaign 4)	Cast member, creator, and producer; creator-owned actual play web series	
2015–present	Critical Role	Various (one-shots)	Cast member, creator, and producer; creator-owned actual play web series	
2015–18	CelebriD&D	Dungeon Master	Celebrity guest D&D show presented by Nerdist	
2016–17	Force Grey	Dungeon Master	Wizards of the Coast D&D show presented by Nerdist and Geek & Sundry	
2016–21	Talks Machina	Himself	44 episodes; Critical Role talkback show	
2019–26	Um, Actually	Himself	6 episodes; trivia game show presented by Dropout	
2019	UnDeadwood	Clayton "The Coffin" Sharpe	Main role; limited series using the Deadlands RPG system presented by Critical Role Productions	
2019–22	Adventuring Academy	Himself	3 episodes; talk show about tabletop RPGs, presented by Dropout	
2019–26	Dimension 20	Kraz-Thun / Leiland	Escape from the Bloodkeep campaign	
2019–26	Dimension 20	"Unlucky Jack" Brakkow	Pirates of Leviathan campaign	
2019–26	Dimension 20	Dungeon Master	The Ravening War campaign	
2019–26	Dimension 20	Lint Lintil	On a Bus: Season 2 special	
2020	Vancouver by Night	Cuthbert Beckett	Episode: "Enter the Maus O'Leum"; actual play series using the Vampire: The Masquerade RPG system	
2020–26	Dimension 20's Adventuring Party	Himself	9 episodes; Dimension 20 talkback show	
2021	L.A. by Night	Cuthbert Beckett	Episode: "Reign in Hell"	
2021–22	Exandria Unlimited	Dariax Zaveon	Main role; also Kymal special in 2022	
2022–24	4-Sided Dive	Himself	14 episodes; Critical Role talkback show	
2023	Candela Obscura	Game Master	3 episodes; actual play web series using the Illuminated Worlds system.	
2024–25	Dirty Laundry	Himself	2 episodes; social deduction game show presented by Dropout	
2025	Exandria Unlimited: Divergence	Garen	Main role	
2025	Lost Odyssey: Godfall	Ghentros	Charity special to support Extra Life; presented by Geek & Sundry, Demiplane and Lost Odyssey Events	
2025	Age of Umbra	Game Master	8 episodes; actual play limited series using the Age of Umbra campaign frame created by Mercer for Daggerheart	
2025	Game Changer	Himself / "Mark Mercer"	Episode: "Fool's Gold", segment: Dimension 20: On a Bus	
2026	Age of Umbra: Sallowlands	Game Master	6 episodes; actual play limited series using the Age of Umbra campaign frame	
2026	Shattered Legends	Game Master	Actual play limited series using the Daggerheart system	
2026–present	Tale Gate	Himself	1 episode; Critical Role talkback show	
