= Batman: Arkham Shadow =

2024 virtual reality superhero game

- Developer: Camouflaj
- Publisher: Oculus Studios
- Director: Ryan Payton
- Producer: Aaron Whiting
- Designers: Ryan Darcey; Bill Green
- Artists: Matt Kohr; David Lam
- Writers: Brendan Murphy; Alexander O. Smith
- Composers: Kazuma Jinnouchi; Nobuko Toda; Chris Burgess; Seth Wright
- Series: Batman: Arkham
- Engine: Unity
- Platforms: Meta Quest 3; Meta Quest 3S
- Release: October 22, 2024
- Genre: Action-adventure
- Mode: Single-player

Batman: Arkham Shadow is a 2024 action-adventure game developed by Camouflaj and published by Oculus Studios. It is the second virtual reality game in the Batman: Arkham series (following Batman: Arkham VR) and a narrative sequel to Batman: Arkham Origins and Batman: Arkham Origins Blackgate (2013). Set six months after the events of Arkham Origins, the game follows a younger and less experienced Batman, who attempts to stop a mysterious villain called the Rat King from destroying Gotham City on the Fourth of July. It also depicts Batman's transition from a violent and vengeful vigilante into a symbol of hope, and explores the evolution of Bruce Wayne's relationship with his childhood friend, Harvey Dent, as well as the events that led to Dent's transformation into the duality-obsessed criminal, Two-Face.

Arkham Shadow was released for the Meta Quest 3 and Meta Quest 3S on October 22, 2024, to critical acclaim.

== Gameplay ==
Batman: Arkham Shadow is an action-adventure video game played from a first-person perspective. In the game, the player assumes control of Batman, who must stop a new villain called the Rat King from unleashing chaos in Gotham City. The rhythmic, free-flow combat from the previous Arkham games returns in Shadow, allowing Batman to attack, stun, and counter. Combining these three main abilities can keep Batman attacking while moving between enemies and avoiding being attacked himself. The stealth predator sections are also back. Batman can activate Detective Vision to identify the locations and the patrol patterns of all enemies in an area, and stealth tactics such as silent takedowns, inverted takedowns, and hiding in grates can be used against armed enemies. Batman also has a large arsenal of tools, such as smoke bombs and batarangs, which can aid him in combat and stealth.

The game's structure is similar to Batman: Arkham Asylum (2009), in which Batman explores a series of large but confined spaces. Batman can glide from heights using his cape, and use his grapple gun to climb onto higher ledges. As players progress, they gain new gadgets and tools, enabling them to reach previously inaccessible areas.

== Synopsis ==
=== Setting and characters ===
Set six months after the events of Batman: Arkham Origins and three months after the events of Batman: Arkham Origins Blackgate (2013), the game follows a young but confident Batman (Roger Craig Smith) who must prevent the mysterious Rat King from executing public officials such as District Attorney Harvey Dent (Troy Baker) and Police Commissioner Jim Gordon (Mark Rolston) and unleashing chaos in Gotham City on the Fourth of July. Batman's allies include his loyal butler Alfred Pennyworth (Martin Jarvis), philanthropist Leslie Thompkins (Mara Junot), Wayne Enterprises business manager Lucius Fox (Dave Fennoy), and Gordon's daughter Barbara (Chelsea Kane). Dick Grayson (Josh Keaton) also makes a brief appearance in the game's post-credits scene.

The game primarily takes place within Blackgate Penitentiary, which is run by Dr. Jonathan Crane (Elijah Wood), Dr. Harleen Quinzel (Tara Strong), and TYGER head of security Lyle Bolton (Earl Baylon). Among the prisoners are crime boss Carmine Falcone (Darin De Paul), the Joker (Baker), Joe Chill (Armin Shimerman), Ratcatcher (Khary Payton), Killer Croc (Payton), Arnold Wesker (Dwight Schultz), Ferris Boyle (Stephen Tobolowsky), Bronze Tiger (Zeno Robinson), Black Mask (Brian Bloom), Deadshot (Chris Cox), Firefly (Crispin Freeman), Bane (Fred Tatasciore), and Deathstroke (Rolston).

=== Plot ===
On Independence Day, a movement led by the Rat King seeks to destroy Gotham. Batman saves several police officers being held hostage by the Rat Cultists in the sewers, but one of the officers is killed. Batman also learns that the Rat King is planning an attack dubbed the "Day of Wrath". At the GCPD headquarters, Batman meets with Commissioner Jim Gordon and District Attorney Harvey Dent to discuss the Rat King. After Dent leaves, a sniper attempts to shoot Gordon; Batman pursues the shooter, identifies him as Shrike, and learns that he is planning to display Rat King propaganda at the Monarch Theatre. Shrike attempts to kill Dent, but is defeated and commits suicide. With much of the public believing he murdered Shrike, Batman assumes the identity of Matches Malone and destroys the Bat-Signal to get himself incarcerated at Blackgate Penitentiary, hoping to discover the Rat King's identity.

At Blackgate, Malone discovers the prison's security is run by the TYGER private military firm led by Lyle Bolton, who resents criminals and often mistreats the prisoners. Over several days, Malone mingles with fellow inmates during the day while changing into Batman to investigate during the night. One of the inmates, Takeo Yamashiro, questions Malone and takes him to meet imprisoned crime boss Carmine Falcone. However, while eavesdropping on Falcone and Bolton, Yamashiro snitches on Malone and instigates a brawl in the prison yard. At night, Batman fights and interrogates Falcone, who claims the Rat King is Otis Flannegan, the Ratcatcher.

The next day, Malone attends group therapy hosted by Jonathan Crane and Harleen Quinzel, which ends with Crane taking one of the patients, Arnold Wesker, to an unknown location. After assisting a fellow inmate named Joe, who runs the prison commissary, with an errand, Malone gains access to the death row wing. As Batman, he fights through TYGER and investigates the aftermath of an apparent struggle. After questioning Flannegan, he learns that Falcone was attacked by Bolton, leading him to investigate the latter's office, where he narrowly escapes from TYGER.

The following day, Bolton beats Falcone in front of the prisoners and challenges one of them to stand up for Falcone. Malone jumps into the ring and defeats Bolton, humiliating him. After being placed in solitary confinement next to the Joker, who recognizes him as Batman, Malone is released by Falcone. Witnessing the growing conflict between Quinzel and Crane, Malone resolves to investigate the latter. At night, Batman rescues Quinzel from TYGER and discovers that Crane has been experimenting on his patients using hallucinogens dubbed "Project Umbra". Batman himself is exposed to the hallucinogens and faces a demonized version of himself, representing his inner shadow, which he overcomes.

In the morning, Malone is taken from his cell and dragged to an interrogation room, where Gordon and Dent confront him over Yamashiro's recent disappearance. Revealing Yamashiro to be an undercover police officer named Chris Nakano, Gordon and Dent accuse Malone of killing him. Due to a lack of evidence, they are forced to release him, and Malone is taken back to solitary confinement, where he converses with Flannegan. At this pre-trial hearing, Malone pleads his innocence and attacks Crane when the latter attempts to drug him. The toxin accidentally splashes onto and disfigures Dent's face, leading him to swear revenge on Malone as he is taken out of the courtroom.

Back at Blackgate, Malone is placed in a gas chamber by Bolton, who has decided to kill him, using the attack on Dent as a pretext. Malone escapes with the help of the Rat Cultists, who believe him to be the Rat King. After burning the Malone identity and clearing the improvised Batcave under Blackgate, Batman boards a ship carrying the Rat Cultists' prisoners, including Nakano. He discovers that the Day of Wrath is a planned attack on the GCPD and that the Rat King is an alternate personality of Dent, born out of his untreated childhood trauma. After the ship crashes into the GCPD building, Batman finds Dent holding Joe at gunpoint. Dent reveals Joe to be Joe Chill, the man who murdered Bruce Wayne's parents, and attempts to kill him, but Batman stops him by unmasking himself as Bruce. While Chill leaves after apologizing, Dent struggles to process the revelation of his friend's double life and jumps off the building, but Bruce saves him.

In the aftermath, Malone is presumed to be the Rat King and still at large, while Leslie Thompkins treats Dent for his dissociative identity disorder. Although Dent has seemingly no recollection of his actions as the Rat King nor the reveal of Batman's identity, another alternate personality tells Bruce that "this is the beginning of us". During the credits, Thompkins informs Bruce that she has found a former Rat he had been asking about, and suggests that Bruce visit him. Meanwhile, Chill returns to Blackgate on his own accord, and Bolton and the other TYGER guards are fired and placed under investigation for their violent treatment of the inmates and for assisting the Rat Cultists. In a post-credits scene, Bruce arrives at Shrike's old apartment to help Dick Grayson, the former Rat Cultist that Thompkins spoke of, finish packing as he adopts him as his ward. Before leaving, Dick mourns the loss of Shrike, but admits his friend was beyond saving. However, Bruce assures him that everyone can be saved, something Dick heartfully agrees on.

== Development ==
Camouflaj, the developer of Iron Man VR (2020) and République (2016), led the game's development. Following the release of Iron Man VR in 2020, Meta Platforms approached Camouflaj for the development of a new project with a bigger budget and larger scope. Camouflaj then began pitching for a Batman game to Warner Bros. and DC Comics for six months, convincing them to greenlight the project after presenting two gameplay prototypes demonstrating the game's combat and traversal. Development of the game lasted about four years. Several employees from Rocksteady Studios, the original creator of the Batman: Arkham franchise, joined the studio to assist in the game's development. Camouflaj billed Arkham Shadow as their biggest game to date, with its overall length being between that of Iron Man VR and Batman: Arkham Asylum.

The team chose the Rat King as the story's villain because they wanted an antagonist fans of the franchise were not familiar with. They sought to use the opportunity to create an original story without being constrained by the events of the Arkham series. The character is separate from the similarly-named Ratcatcher, though the team affirmed the Ratcatcher would also play a role in the game. Inspired by Half Life: Alyx (2020), the team strove to ensure that the transition between gameplay and cutscenes was seamless. Learning from players' feedback for Iron Man VR, the team spent time to ensure that combat encounters were better paced so that players would not be fatigued easily. For the combat, they attempted to recreate the free-flowing system from previous Batman games while implementing gesture-based controls, taking inspirations from Beat Saber (2019) and Superhot VR (2016). Arkham Asylum also served as an important inspiration for the team, influencing Shadow's structure, combat, and overall scope.

== Release ==
Batman: Arkham Shadow was officially announced in May 2024. Publisher Oculus Studios released the game for Meta Quest 3 and Meta Quest 3S on October 22, 2024, and it was included for free with new headset purchases until April 30, 2025.

== Reception ==
Reception

Aggregate scores
Aggregator	Score
Metacritic	85/100
OpenCritic	100% recommend

Review scores
Publication	Score
Destructoid	8.5/10
Digital Trends	4/5
Eurogamer	4/5
Game Informer	8.75/10
IGN	8/10

Batman: Arkham Shadow received "generally favorable" reviews, according to review aggregator website Metacritic. Fellow review aggregator OpenCritic assessed that the game received "mighty" approval, being recommended by 100% of critics.

Dan Stapleton of IGN rated the game a score of 8 out of 10, praising the translation of the Batman: Arkham franchise into a VR format. Stapleton took note of the game's combat and its differences from the series' previous combat systems. He characterized it as working "surprisingly well" and "interesting", though he criticized the stealth sections for their controls, as well as the game's bugs and boss fights, citing most of them as "unmemorable". He praised the fidelity of the game, labeling it "the best-looking [Meta] Quest-exclusive game I've played."

=== Awards and accolades ===
Year	Award	Category	Result	Ref.
2024	The Game Awards 2024	Best AR/VR Game	Won	
2025	New York Game Awards 2024	Coney Island Dreamland Award for Best AR/VR Game	Won	
2025	28th Annual D.I.C.E. Awards	Action Game of the Year	Nominated	
2025	28th Annual D.I.C.E. Awards	Immersive Reality Game of the Year	Won	
2025	28th Annual D.I.C.E. Awards	Immersive Reality Technical Achievement	Nominated	
2025	28th Annual D.I.C.E. Awards	Outstanding Technical Achievement	Nominated	
2025	21st British Academy Games Awards	Technical Achievement	Longlisted	
2025	21st British Academy Games Awards	Performer in a Leading Role (Roger Craig Smith as Batman, Bruce Wayne, Matches Malone)	Longlisted	
2025	21st British Academy Games Awards	Performer in a Supporting Role (Troy Baker as Harvey Dent, Rat King, Two-Face, Joker)	Longlisted	

== Cancelled sequel ==
When questioned about a potential sequel to Batman: Arkham Shadow, Ryan Payton, Camouflaj's founder and studio head, responded "We hope we make it a really easy decision for leadership over at Meta and at Warner Brothers to tap us on the shoulders to do a sequel... [And] we would very much love to do that." In September 2025, Jim Gordon's voice actor Mark Rolston confirmed in an interview that a sequel was in early development. However, in January 2026, Meta Platforms laid off around 10% of the staff in its Reality Labs division. The game studios Sanzaru Games, Twisted Pixel, and Armature (who had previously developed Batman: Arkham Origins Blackgate) were shut down as a result. It was later reported that Sanzaru was the studio developing the sequel to Batman: Arkham Shadow, which, coupled with Meta's departure from making VR games, indicates that the game was likely cancelled.
