= Matthew Mercer =

American voice actor

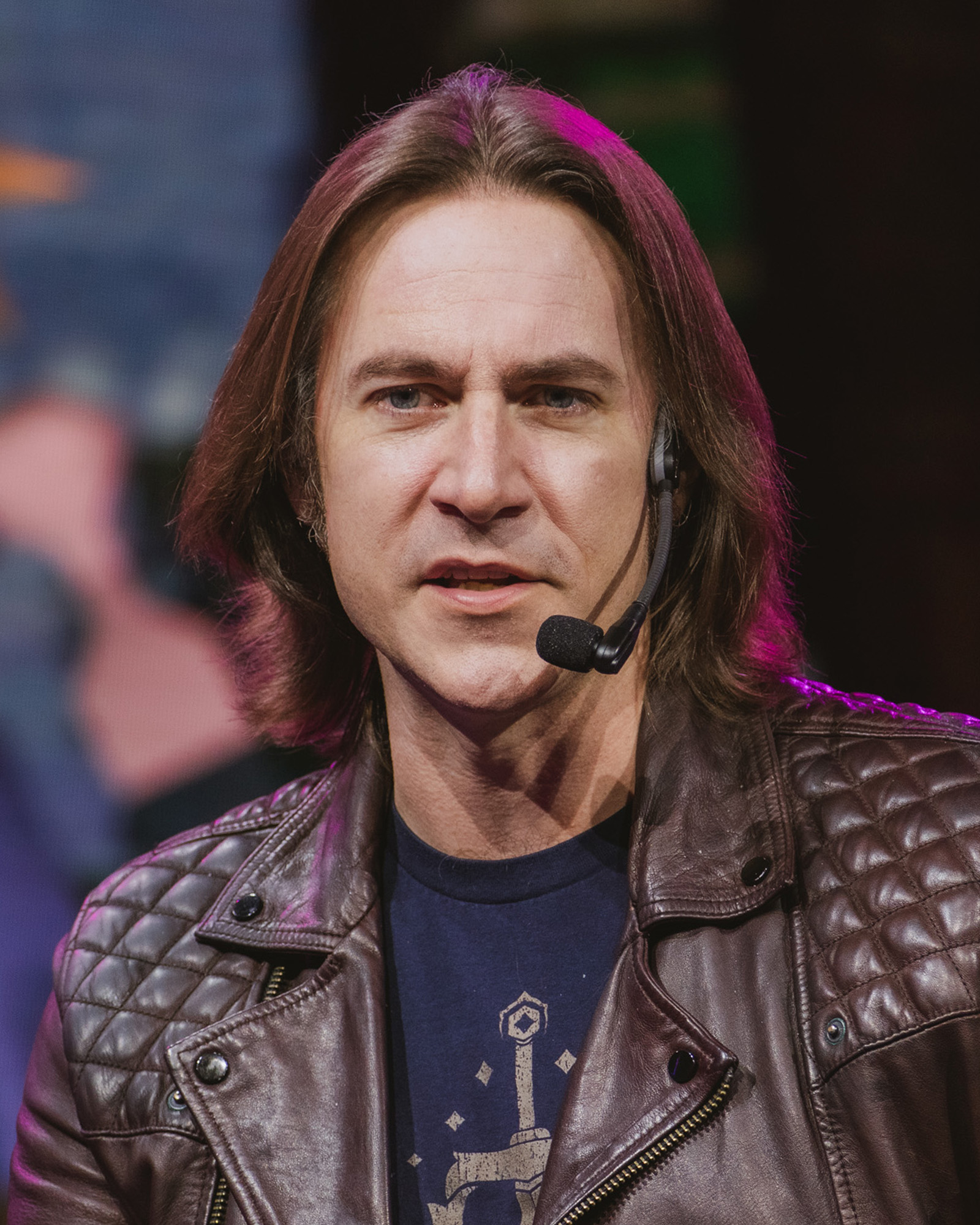
- Mercer in 2024
- Born: Matthew Christopher Miller; Palm Beach Gardens, Florida, U.S.
- Occupations: Voice actor; game designer; chief creative officer
- Years active: 2002–present
- Works: Filmography
- Spouse: Marisha Ray (m. 2017)

Matthew Christopher Miller, known professionally as Matthew Mercer or Matt Mercer, is an American voice actor, game designer, and gamemaster. He has been a voice-over artist in video games and animation since 2002.

Notable animation credits include Levi Ackerman in Attack on Titan, Kiritsugu Emiya in Fate/Zero, Jotaro Kujo in JoJo's Bizarre Adventure, Yamato in Naruto, Trafalgar Law in One Piece, Hit in Dragon Ball Super, and Leorio in Hunter x Hunter.

Mercer's video games credits include Leon S. Kennedy in Resident Evil 6, Kurtis Stryker in Mortal Kombat, Chrom in Fire Emblem, Jack Cooper in Titanfall 2, Cole Cassidy in Overwatch, Yusuke Kitagawa in Persona 5, Goro Majima in Like a Dragon, Ganondorf in The Legend of Zelda: Tears of the Kingdom, Espio the Chameleon in Sonic the Hedgehog, Shroud in Dispatch, Minsc in Baldur's Gate 3 and Vincent Valentine in Final Fantasy VII Rebirth.

Mercer developed and served as the Dungeon Master for the Dungeons & Dragons web series Critical Role since it premiered in 2015. He is the chief creative officer of Critical Role Productions. As a game designer, he has worked on tabletop role-playing game books such as Explorer's Guide to Wildemount (2020), Tal'Dorei Campaign Setting Reborn (2022), Critical Role: Call of the Netherdeep (2022), and Daggerheart (2025).

== Early life ==
Matthew Christopher Miller was born in Palm Beach Gardens, Florida. He is primarily of Scottish descent. His family moved to Los Angeles when he was eight years old. He attended Agoura High School in Agoura Hills, California. His father was a musician/audio engineer and his mother was an actress and writer. He has a brother who is a musician under the stage name Dave Heatwave. He spoke with a stutter when he was young, leading his father (who also stuttered) to recruit a speech therapist who managed to reduce the effects to the point that only certain words trigger it. He stated that practicing voices, theater and singing helped him conquer his stutter.He adopted "Mercer", which members of his family had used in the past, as his stage surname because his birth name was too similar to someone already represented by SAG-AFTRA. He had a stint as a member of The Groundlings.

== Career ==
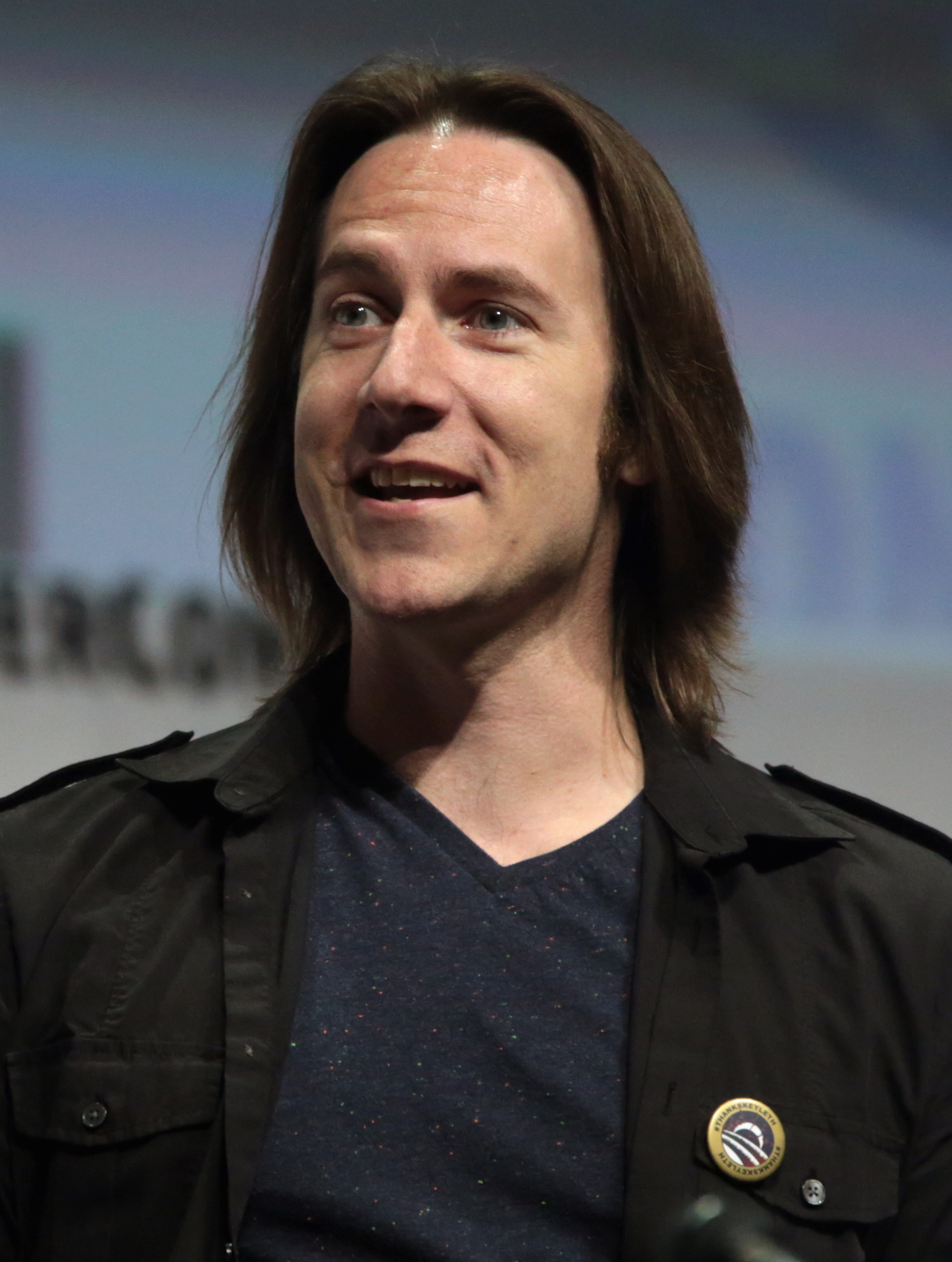
Mercer at the 2017 WonderCon

Mercer's family advised him against moving into theatre as a career, and so he initially considered working in animation. He was dissuaded by advice from professional animators about the working conditions in that field however, and joined the games industry instead. In his early career he worked as a QA tester and later associate producer on a number of Edutainment titles developed by Sound Source Interactive and TDK Mediactive. After "friends of his father got him some odd jobs in voiceover", Mercer decided to pursue the profession, and resigned from his game development job.

Mercer began his voice acting career performing English walla and additional characters in several Japanese anime, and has since also worked in cartoons, video games, and radio commercials. He has been a guest at conventions around the world, hosting at events such as Anime Expo and Anime Matsuri. He directed and produced the web series There Will Be Brawl, based on the Super Smash Bros. video game series, where he provided the voices for both Meta Knight and Kirby, and portrayed the role of Ganondorf. He also acted in several shows from the Geek & Sundry and Nerdist networks and produced the web series Fear News with the Last Girl for FEARnet which was a 2010 Webby Awards Honoree for the Experimental & Weird category.

In 2016, Mercer served as the Dungeon Master for Force Grey: Giant Hunters, which ran for 2 seasons. In 2017, he was the Dungeon Master for the Nerdist show CelebriD&D, which puts D&D-playing celebrities into a small, mini-campaign where they are paired with role-players. He has also been a player in other actual play web series such as Dimension 20 and L.A. by Night.

=== Critical Role ===
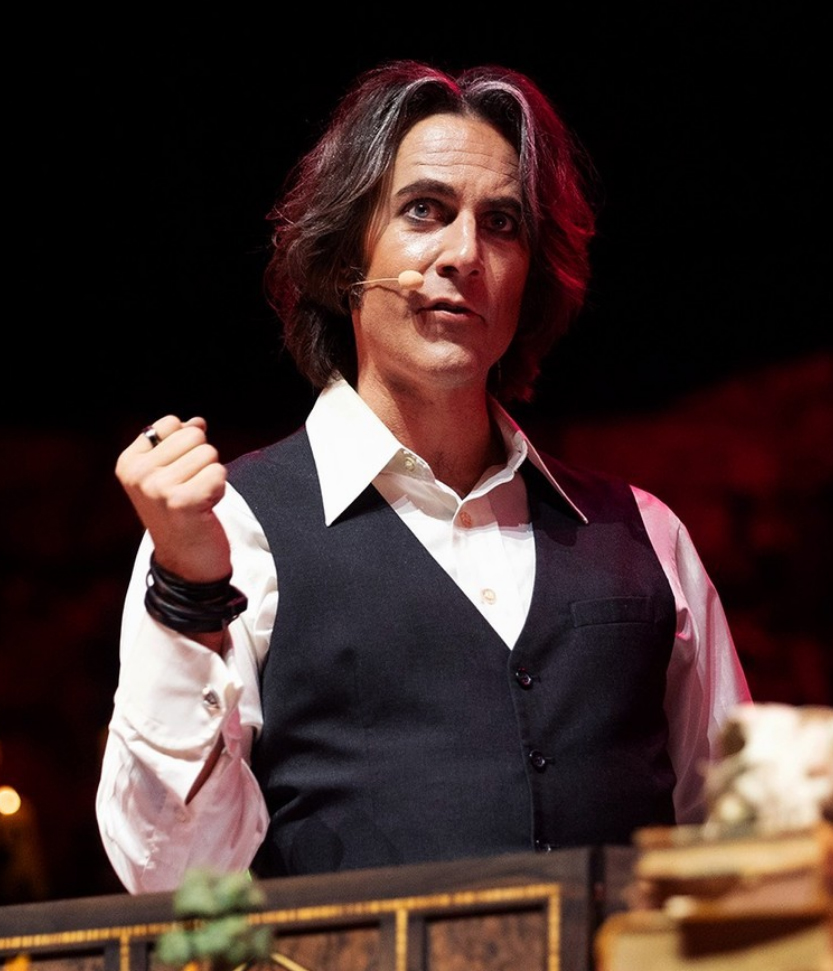
Mercer at the 2023 Critical Role live show in Wembley Arena

Mercer is the Dungeon Master of the web series Critical Role, which launched on Geek & Sundry in 2015, where he leads several other voice actors through a Dungeons & Dragons campaign. Critical Role was both the Webby Winner and the People's Voice Winner in the "Games (Video Series & Channels)" category at the 2019 Webby Awards; the show was also both a Finalist and the Audience Honor Winner in the "Games" category at the 2019 Shorty Awards. After becoming hugely successful, the Critical Role cast left the Geek & Sundry network in early 2019 and set up their own production company, Critical Role Productions; Mercer is the company's chief creative officer. Soon after, they aimed to raise $750,000 on Kickstarter to create an animated series of their first campaign, but ended up raising over $11 million. This feat went on to set a Guinness World Record for the most-funded TV series project in Kickstarter's history. In November 2019, Amazon Prime Video announced that they had acquired the streaming rights to this animated series, now titled The Legend of Vox Machina; Mercer reprised his role as Sylas Briarwood and other characters.

Luke Winkie, in a human-interest story for Slate, called Mercer "an expert improviser" and "a maestro with the dice in his hands, weaving interlocking plot lines and complex thematic threads out of thin air" with "the innate ability to make a Dungeons & Dragons campaign feel like a tightly wound limited drama". Winkie commented that "it can be downright intimidating to watch Mercer when he's at the peak of his powers. As a career voice actor, he possesses all of the subtle performance intangibles that saturate his storytelling with life: the timing, the verve, the language flourishes". Academics Zac Boyd and Míša Hejná, in the journal Language in Society, highlighted that Mercer "introduced 1,144 unique NPC characters during" the second campaign of Critical Role. They analyzed nineteen characters based on exceeding a threshold of minimum voice time and plot relevance and determined through "holistic analysis of voice quality" of these characters that "breathiness" in Mercer's voice "emerged as signalling positive morality and stances of safety, comfort, and trust, where whisperiness signals negative morality and stances of threat. Qualitatively, pitch dynamism was also found to correlate with morality and stancetaking: the more limited the pitch dynamism, the more likely it is that the character portrayed is an Enemy and that they adopt stances of threat".

In October 2020, Mercer became the creative advisor for the Critical Role board and card game imprint called Darrington Press. From June to August 2021, Mercer appeared on Exandria Unlimited, a spinoff of Critical Role, as a player. In March 2022, he reprised his role in the two part special Exandria Unlimited: Kymal. In 2025, he was the game master for the Age of Umbra limited series. In August 2025, Critical Role announced that Brennan Lee Mulligan would take over as Game Master from Mercer for their fourth campaign, which premiered on October 2, 2025; Mercer appears in the campaign as a player. Rolling Stone stated that "the inclusion of Mulligan is huge, but not entirely surprising" given Mulligan's background as "a well-established Game Master" along with previous comments made by Mercer on eventually shifting "into a 'Professor X' role as a mentor to the next generation of storytellers rather than remaining the face of the brand in perpetuity".

=== Game design ===
Hayley McCullough, for American Journalism, commented that "Mercer is well-known for his homebrew mechanics, character classes, and feats". Mercer's work as Dungeon Master has led to the development of three campaign setting books being published about his world of Exandria. The first is the Critical Role: Tal'Dorei Campaign Setting (2017) published through Green Ronin Publishing. The second is the Explorer's Guide to Wildemount (2020) published through Wizards of the Coast, thus making Exandria an official Dungeons & Dragons campaign setting. The third is Tal'Dorei Campaign Setting Reborn (2022), a revised and expanded edition of the Tal'Dorei Campaign Setting, which was published by Darrington Press, the publishing label created by Critical Role Productions. Tal'Dorei Campaign Setting Reborn was nominated for the 2022 ENNIE Awards in the "Best Setting" category.

On March 15, 2022, a new adventure module titled Critical Role: Call of the Netherdeep (2022), with Mercer, James Haeck, and Chris Perkins as lead designers, was released. It is the second collaboration book between Wizards of the Coast and Critical Role Productions. Mercer was then a consultant on the Dungeon Master's Guide (2024) for the revised 5th Edition of Dungeons & Dragons. Mercer was a designer on Daggerheart (2025), a tabletop role-playing game system by Darrington Press, and created the "Age of Umbra" campaign frame for the system.

== Personal life ==
Mercer began dating voice actress and Critical Role co-star Marisha Ray in 2011. They were engaged in 2016 and married on October 21, 2017. The video of his proposal became popular among fans as it involved an escape room game he secretly created with the Critical Role cast as a surprise for Ray. They have a pet corgi named Omar. Their pet green-cheeked conure, Dagon, died in December 2021.

Mercer said in 2017 that, while he is heterosexual, he has also been attracted to men in the past and experienced homophobia while growing up as a boy who liked to experiment with an androgynous appearance. He explained that he tries his best in storytelling to also represent the experiences of close LGBT family and friends. As an activist, he works with various LGBTQ rights charities like OutRight Action International. In 2018, he revealed that he suffers from body dysmorphic disorder and has always struggled with his physical appearance.

== Bibliography ==
=== Role-playing games ===
- Critical Role: Tal'Dorei Campaign Setting (writer and designer, Green Ronin Publishing, 2017)
- Explorer's Guide to Wildemount (lead writer, Wizards of the Coast, 2020)
- Doom Eternal Assault on Armaros Station (writer, Critical Role Productions, 2020)
- Tal'Dorei Campaign Setting Reborn (lead designer, Darrington Press, 2022)
- Critical Role: Call of the Netherdeep (project lead, Wizards of the Coast, 2022)
- Daggerheart (designer, Darrington Press, 2025)
