= Reality Labs =

Virtual and augmented reality products company

- Formerly: Oculus VR (2012–2020); Facebook Reality Labs (2020–2021)
- Type: Division
- Founded: 2012
- Founder: Palmer Luckey
- Headquarters: United States
- Area served: Worldwide
- Key people: Andrew Bosworth
- Products: Meta Quest 3; Meta Quest 3S; Quest 2; Meta Quest Pro; Ray-Ban Stories; Horizon Worlds
- Revenue: ▲US$2.2 billion (2025)
- Operating income: ▼ −US$19.1 billion (2025)
- Number of employees: 15,000 (2026)
- Parent: Meta Platforms
- Website: about.meta.com/realitylabs

Reality Labs, formerly Facebook Reality Labs and Oculus VR, is a business and research unit of Meta Platforms (formerly Facebook Inc.) that produces virtual reality (VR) and augmented reality (AR) hardware and software, including virtual reality headsets such as the Quest, and online platforms such as Horizon Worlds. In June 2022, several artificial intelligence (AI) initiatives that were previously a part of Meta AI were transitioned to Reality Labs. This also includes Meta's fundamental AI Research laboratory FAIR which is now part of the Reality Labs - Research (RLR) division.

The Reality Labs unit is the result of the merger of several initiatives under Meta Platforms and the incorporation of several acquired companies. This includes CTRL-Labs founded by Thomas Reardon which develops non-invasive neural interface technology as well as Oculus, a company that was founded in 2012 by Palmer Luckey, Brendan Iribe, Michael Antonov and Nate Mitchell to develop a VR headset for video gaming.

== History ==
=== Founding ===
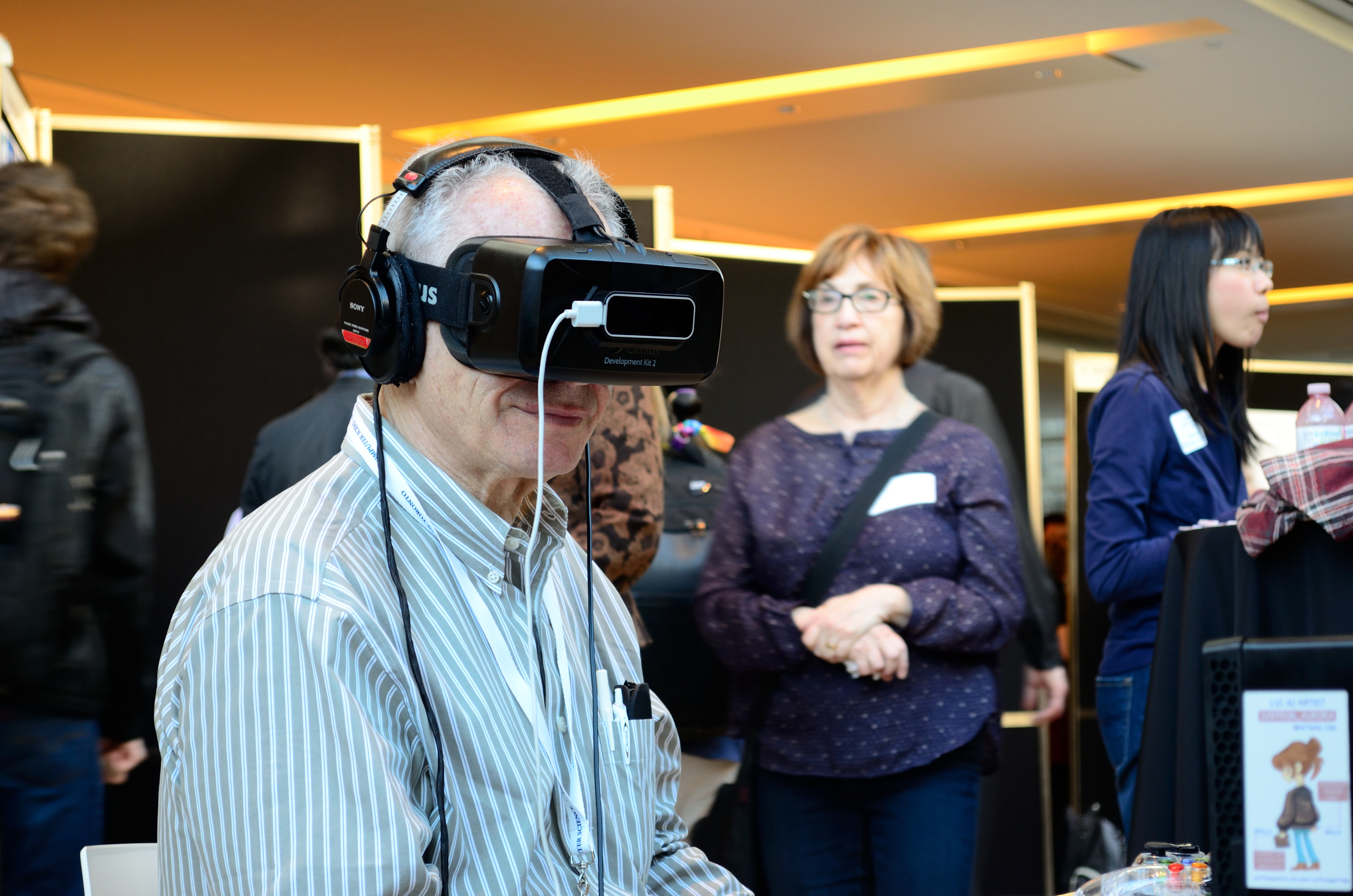
Oculus Rift DK2 worn at a research showcase (Leap Motion sensor attached to the front)

As a head-mounted display (HMD) designer at the University of Southern California Institute for Creative Technologies, Palmer Luckey earned a reputation for having the largest personal collection of HMDs in the world and was a longtime moderator in Meant to be Seen (MTBS)'s discussion forums.

Palmer created a series of new technologies that resulted in a VR headset that was both higher performance than what was currently on the market and was also inexpensive for gamers. To develop the new product, Luckey founded Oculus VR with Scaleform co-founders Brendan Iribe and Michael Antonov, Nate Mitchell and Andrew Scott Reisse.

Coincidentally, John Carmack of id Software had been doing his research on HMDs and happened upon Palmer's developments. After sampling an early unit, Carmack favored Luckey's prototype, and just before the 2012 Electronic Entertainment Expo (E3), id Software announced that the BFG Edition of Doom 3 would be compatible with head-mounted display units.

During the convention, Carmack introduced a duct-taped head-mounted display, based on Palmer's Oculus Rift prototype, which ran Carmack's software. The unit featured a high-speed IMU and a 5.6-inch (14 cm) LCD, visible via dual lenses that were positioned over the eyes to provide a 90 degree horizontal and 110 degree vertical stereoscopic 3D perspective. Carmack later left id Software as he was hired as Oculus VR's chief technology officer.

=== Funding for Oculus Rift and company ===
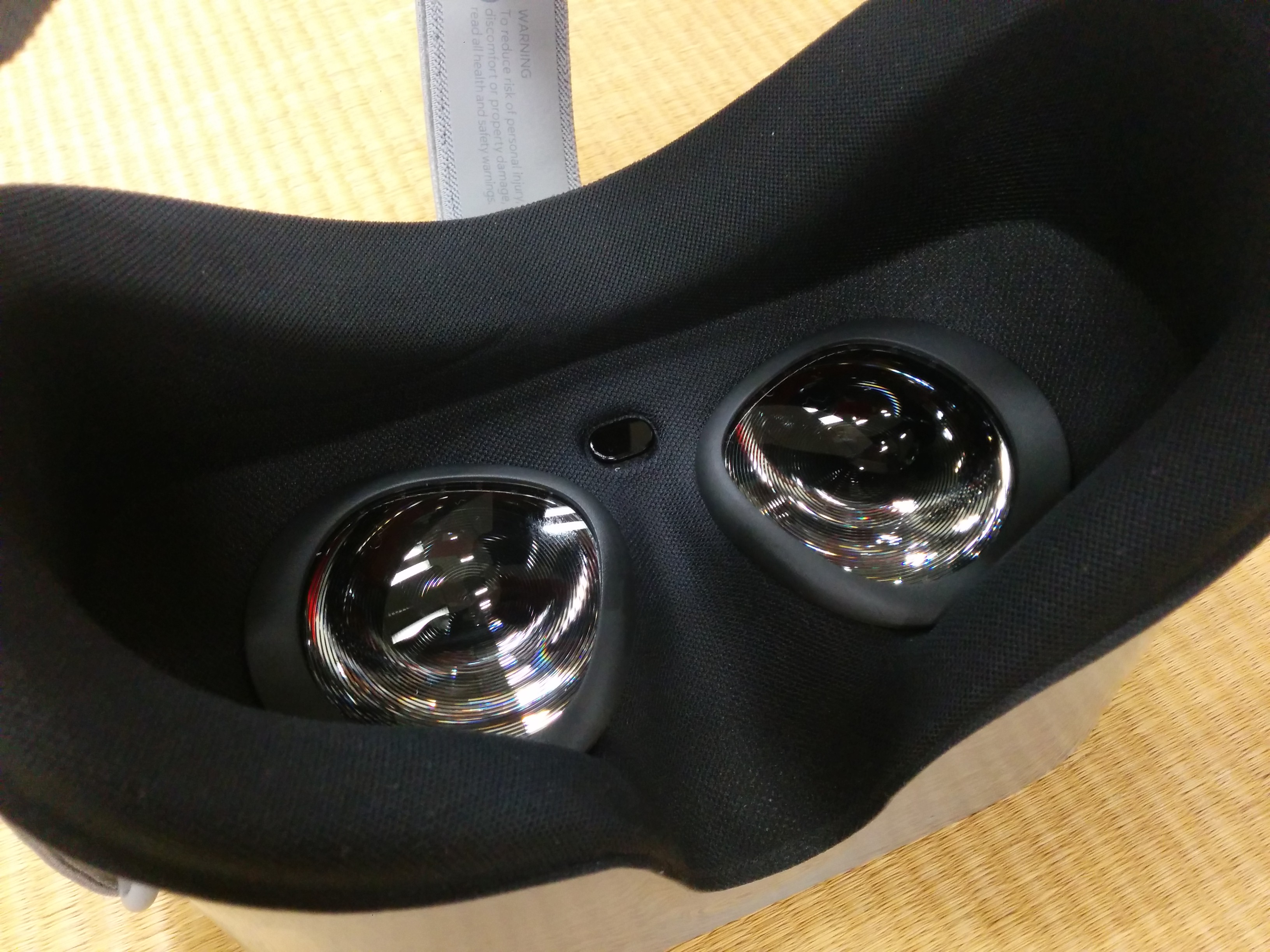
Lenses inside an Oculus headset

The Oculus Rift prototype was demonstrated at E3 in June 2012. On August 1, 2012, the company announced a Kickstarter campaign to further develop the product. Oculus announced that the "dev kit" version of the Oculus Rift would be given as a reward to backers who pledged $300 or more on Kickstarter, with an expected shipping date set of December 2012 (though they did not actually ship until March 2013).

There was also a limited run of 100 unassembled Rift prototype kits for pledges over $275 that would ship a month earlier. Both versions were intended to include Doom 3 BFG Edition, but Rift support in the game was not ready, so to make up for it they included a choice of discount vouchers for either Steam or the Oculus store. Within four hours of the announcement, Oculus secured its intended amount of US$250,000, and in less than 36 hours, the campaign had surpassed $1 million in funding, eventually ending with $2,437,429.

On December 12, 2013, Marc Andreessen joined the company's board when his firm, Andreessen Horowitz, led the $75 million Series B venture funding. In total, Oculus VR has raised $91 million with $2.4 million raised via crowdfunding.

=== Acquisition by Facebook ===
Although Oculus only released a development prototype of its headset, on March 25, 2014, Mark Zuckerberg announced that Facebook, Inc. would be acquiring Oculus for US$2 billion, pending regulatory approval. The deal included $400 million in cash and 23.1 million common shares of Facebook, valued at $1.6 billion, as well as an additional $300 million assuming Facebook reaches certain milestones. This move was ridiculed by some backers who felt the acquisition was counter to the independent ideology of crowdfunding.

Many Kickstarter backers and game industry figures, such as Minecraft developer Markus Persson, criticized the sale of Oculus to Facebook. On March 28, 2014, Michael Abrash joined the company as Chief Scientist. As of January 2015, the Oculus headquarters has been moved from Irvine, California to Menlo Park, where Facebook's headquarters are also located. Oculus has stated that this move is for their employees to be closer to Silicon Valley.

In May 2015, Oculus acquired British company Surreal Vision, a company based on 3D scene-mapping reconstruction and augmented reality. News reported that Oculus and Surreal Vision could create "mixed reality" technology in Oculus' products, similar to the upcoming HMD, Microsoft HoloLens. They reported that Oculus, with Surreal's help, will make telepresence possible.

On March 28, 2016, the first consumer version of Oculus Rift, Oculus Rift "CV1", was released. In October 2017, Oculus unveiled the standalone mobile headset Oculus Go in partnership with Chinese electronics manufacturer Xiaomi. On December 28, 2016, Facebook acquired Danish eye tracking startup The Eye Tribe. In September 2018, Oculus became a division of a new structural entity within Facebook known as Facebook Technologies, LLC. Facebook announced in August 2018 they had entered negotiations to lease the entire Burlingame Point campus in Burlingame, California, then under construction. The lease was executed in late 2018, and the site, owned by Kylli, a subsidiary of Genzon Investment Group, is expected to be complete by 2020. Oculus was expected to move to Burlingame Point when development is complete.

In February 2019, Facebook released Oculus Quest, a high-end standalone headset. In March 2019, Facebook unveiled Oculus Rift S, an updated revision of the original Rift PC headset in partnership with Chinese electronics manufacturer Lenovo, which featured updated hardware and features carried over from the Go and Quest.

On August 13, 2019, Nate Mitchell, Oculus co-founder and VP of product announced his departure from the company. On November 13, 2019, John Carmack wrote in a Facebook post that he would step down as CTO of Oculus to focus on developing artificial general intelligence. He stated he would remain involved with the company as a "Consulting CTO".

In September 2020, Facebook unveiled Oculus Quest 2, an update to the original Quest with a revised design and updated hardware.

=== Facebook integration ===
Upon the acquisition of Oculus by Facebook, Inc., Luckey "guaranteed" that "you won't need to log into your Facebook account every time you wanna use the Oculus Rift." Under its ownership, Oculus has been promoted as a brand of Facebook rather than an independent entity and has increasingly integrated Facebook platforms into Oculus products. Support for optional Facebook integration was added to Gear VR in March 2016, with a focus on integration with the social network, and integrations with features such as Facebook Video and social games. By 2016, the division began to be largely marketed as Oculus from Facebook.

In September 2016, support for optional Facebook integration was added to the Oculus Rift software, automatically populating the friends list with Facebook friends who have also linked their accounts (displaying them to each other under their real names, but still displaying screen names to anyone else). Users have been increasingly encouraged to use Facebook accounts to sign into its services (although standalone accounts not directly linked to the service were still supported).

In 2018, Oculus VR became a division of Facebook Technologies, LLC, to create "a single legal entity that can support multiple Facebook technology and hardware products" (such as Facebook Portal).

On August 18, 2020, Facebook announced that all "decisions around use, processing, retention, and sharing of [user] data" on its platforms will be delegated to the Facebook social network moving forward. Users became subject to the unified Facebook privacy policy, code of conduct, and community guidelines, and all users will be required to have a Facebook account to access Oculus products and services. Standalone account registration became unavailable in October 2020, all future Oculus hardware (beginning with Quest 2) will only support Facebook accounts, and support for existing standalone Oculus accounts on already-released products will end on January 1, 2023. Facebook stated that this was needed to facilitate "more Facebook powered multiplayer and social experiences" and make it "easier to share across our platforms". Facebook stated that users would still be able to control sharing from Oculus, maintain a separate friends list within the Oculus platform, and hide their real name to others.

Users and media criticized Facebook for the move. Ars Technica noted that there is no clear way to opt-out of information tracking and that the collected data will likely be used for targeted advertising. Furthermore, Facebook requires the use of a person's real name. In September 2020, Facebook temporarily suspended sales of all Oculus products in Germany; a German watchdog had presented concerns that this integration requirement violates the General Data Protection Regulation (GDPR), which prohibits making use of a service contingent on consenting to the collection of personally identifiable information, and the requirement that existing users also link to a Facebook account to use Oculus hardware and services.

On August 25, 2020, Facebook announced the formation of Facebook Reality Labs, a new unit that would encompass all of Facebook's virtual and augmented reality (AR) hardware and software, including Oculus, Portal, and Facebook Spark AR. The Oculus Connect conference was also renamed Facebook Connect.

In June 2021, Facebook announced it would do a test launch of targeted advertisements in applications for Oculus Quest. The company claims that movement data, voice recordings and raw images from the headset will not be used in targeting. Instead, the ads will rely on information from the user's Facebook profile and all user activity related to Oculus, including apps used or installed. The company has not stated whether ads will appear only in applications or in the Oculus Home experience as well.

In July 2021, Facebook announced it would be deprecating its proprietary Oculus API and adding full support for OpenXR.

=== Rebranding of Oculus as Meta ===
On October 25, 2021, during Connect, Facebook announced that it would invest $10 billion over the next year into Reality Labs, and that it would begin to report its revenue separately from the Facebook "Family of Apps"—which includes Facebook, Messenger, Instagram, and WhatsApp. Three days later on October 28, Facebook announced that it would change its corporate name to Meta (legally Meta Platforms, Inc.), as part of the company's long-term focus on metaverses and related technologies. The company also teased a "high-end" mixed reality headset codenamed "Project Cambria".

As a result, CTO Andrew Bosworth announced that the Oculus brand would be phased out in 2022; all Facebook hardware products will be marketed under the Meta name, and Oculus Store would be renamed Quest Store. Likewise, immersive social platforms associated with Oculus will be brought under the Horizon brand (such as Horizon Worlds). He also stated that "as we've heard feedback from the VR community more broadly, we're working on new ways to log into Quest that won't require a Facebook account, landing sometime next year. This is one of our highest priority areas of work internally".

In January 2022, the Oculus social media accounts were renamed "Meta Quest" in reference to its current VR product line. Concurrently, Meta began to retroactively refer to the Quest 2 as the "Meta Quest 2"—a change that has since been reflected in the packaging and hardware of subsequent units.

In July 2022, Meta began to migrate Oculus accounts to the new "Meta account" system, which can be optionally linked with Facebook, Instagram, and WhatsApp accounts. In October 2022, "Project Cambria" was officially unveiled as the Meta Quest Pro.

=== 2026 ===
In January 2026, Reality Labs cut 10% of Reality Lab jobs as part of a streamlining of its VR investments to increase quality of software and hardware to make the business "more sustainable". Meta plans to stop sales of commercial SKUs of Meta Quest headsets on February 20, 2026, as part of this quality streamlining effort.

As of January 2026, Reality Labs has accumulated a total of $80 billion in total operating losses since late 2020.

== Products ==
=== Virtual reality headsets ===
The initial Oculus headsets, produced under the "Oculus Rift" brand, are traditional VR headsets that require a PC to operate. In February 2019, Facebook first released Oculus Quest—a standalone headset which contains integrated mobile computing hardware and does not require a PC to operate, but can optionally be used with Oculus Rift-compatible VR software by connecting it to a PC over USB-C.

In 2018, Facebook CEO Mark Zuckerberg stated that the original Oculus Rift "CV1", Oculus Go (a lower-end standalone headset released in 2017), and Quest represented the company's first generation of products, and expected that successors to the three headsets would form its second generation. Oculus began to phase out the original Oculus Rift "CV1" in 2019, in favor of Oculus Rift S — a follow-up to the original model manufactured by Lenovo that incorporates elements of the Go and Quest. In September 2020, the Oculus Quest 2 was unveiled as an updated iteration of the first-generation Quest, and the Rift S was concurrently discontinued—making Quest the division's sole active product line.

==== Quest ====
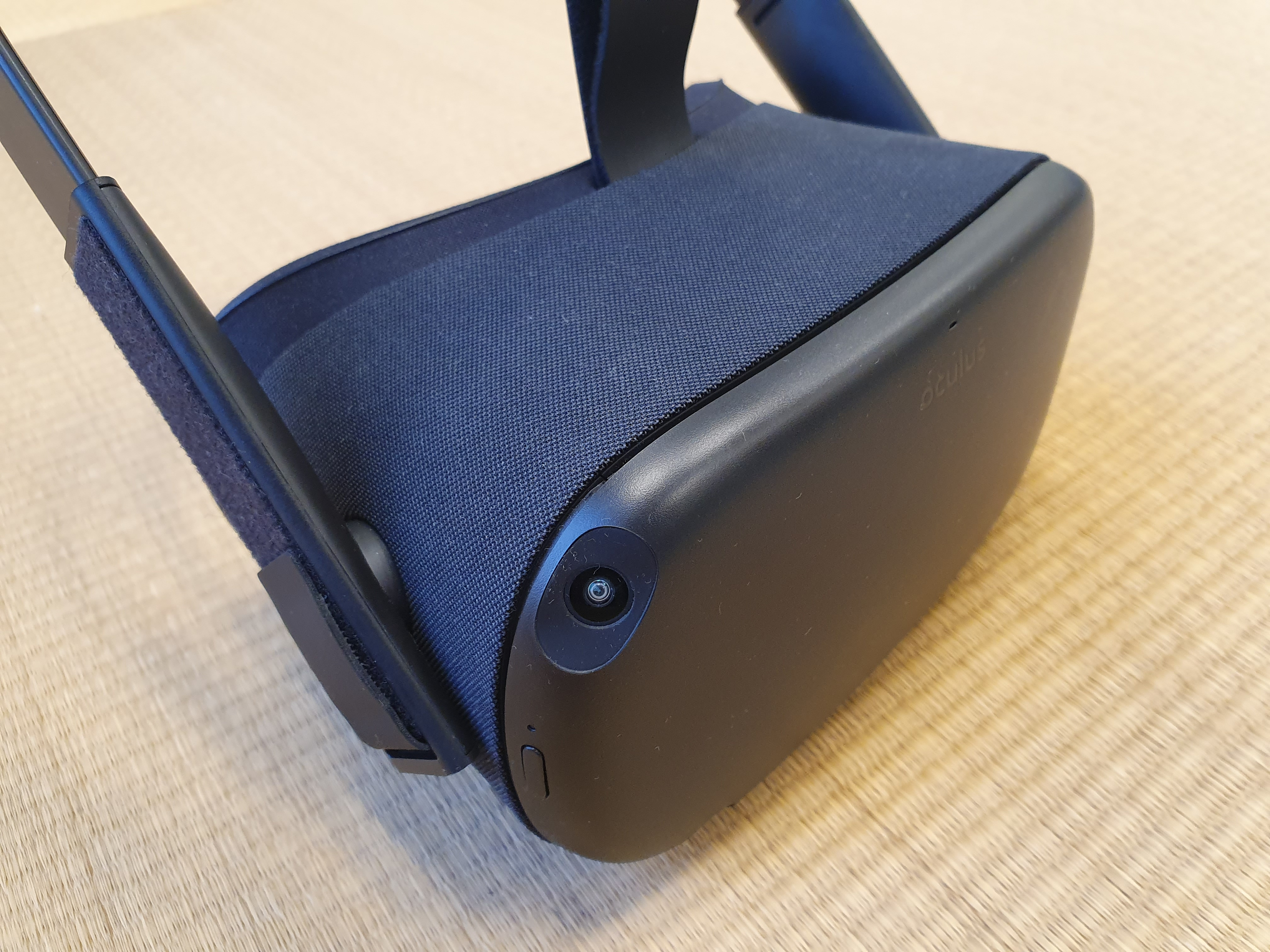
The first-generation Oculus Quest

On September 26, 2018, Facebook unveiled Oculus Quest. It is a standalone headset which is not dependent on a PC for operation; the Quest contains embedded mobile hardware running an operating system based on Android source code, including a Snapdragon 835 system-on-chip, and 64 or 128 GB of internal storage. It contains two OLED displays with a resolution of 1600x1440 per-eye and running at 72 Hz. It supports included Oculus Touch controllers via an "inside-out" motion tracking system known as "Oculus insight", which consists of a series of cameras embedded in the headset. The controllers were redesigned to properly function with Insight.

It supports games and applications downloaded via Oculus Store, with ported launch titles such as Beat Saber and Robo Recall. It also supports cross-platform multiplayer and cross-buys between PC and Quest. Facebook stated that they would impose stricter content and quality standards for software distributed for Quest than its other platforms, including requiring developers to undergo a pre-screening of their concepts to demonstrate "quality and probable market success". In June 2019, Facebook announced it sold $5 million worth of content for the Oculus Quest in its first two weeks on sale.

In November 2019, Facebook released a beta for a new feature known as Oculus Link, which allows Oculus Rift-compatible software to be streamed from a PC to a Quest headset over USB. In May 2020, Facebook added additional support for the use of USB 2.0 cables, such as the charging cable supplied with the headset. Support for controller-free hand tracking was also launched that month.

In September 2020, Facebook unveiled an updated version of the Quest, Oculus Quest 2. It is similar to the original Quest, but with the Snapdragon XR2 system-on-chip and additional RAM, an all plastic exterior, new cloth head straps, updated Oculus Touch controllers with improved ergonomics and battery life, and a 1832x1920 display running at 90 Hz, and up to 120 Hz as an experimental option. Similarly to the Rift S, it uses a single display panel rather than individual panels for each eye. Due to this design, it has more limited inter-pupillary distance options than the original Quest, with the ability to physically move the lenses to adjust for 3 common measurements. The Quest 2's models were both priced US$100 cheaper than their first-generation equivalents at launch, but its prices were increased in July 2022 for economic reasons.

In October 2022, Meta unveiled Quest Pro, a mixed reality headset aimed primarily at enterprise and prosumer markets. The headset uses quantum dot displays, with thinner optics using pancake lenses for a more visor-like form factor, and has upgraded color passthrough cameras designed to facilitate mixed reality applications. Its hardware is upgraded from the Quest 2, with the Snapdragon XR2+ system-on-chip, increased RAM, and updated controllers with built-in tracking. These controllers were also made available for the existing Quest 2 as an optional accessory.

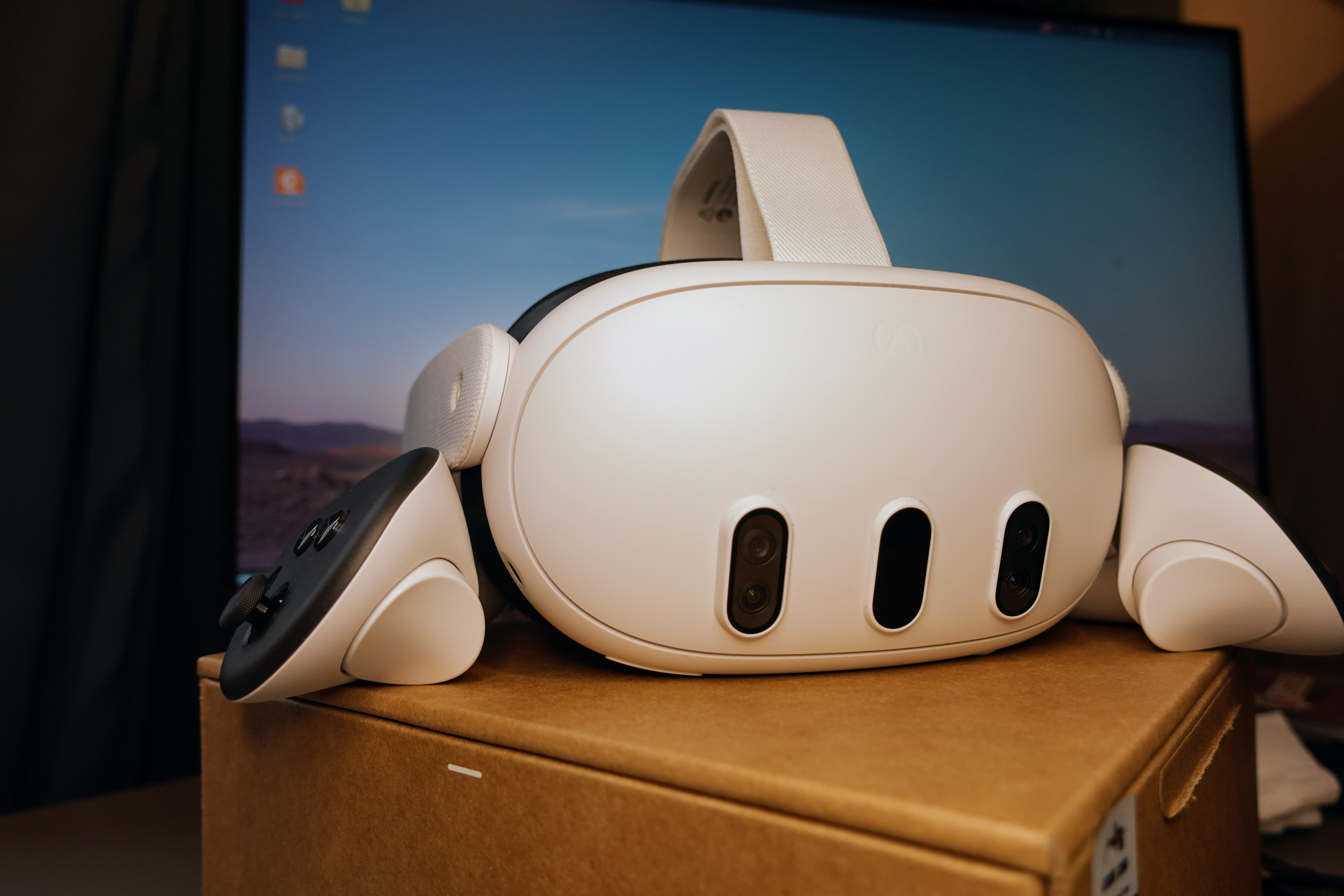
A Meta Quest 3 and controllers

On June 1, 2023, Meta announced the Quest 3, which was released on October 10, 2023. It features design and hardware features from the Quest Pro, including pancake lenses for a slimmer build, upgraded hardware (including the Snapdragon XR2 Gen 2 system-on-chip) and higher resolution displays, color passthrough cameras for mixed reality, as well as a depth sensor, and updated controllers inspired by the design of the Quest Pro (albeit still using inside-out tracking via infrared sensors, as with its predecessors). Meta positioned the Quest 3 as a high-end model, with the Quest 2 continuing to be sold alongside it.

On April 22, 2024, Meta announced that its Android-based system software would be branded as Horizon OS, and that it would license the platform to third-parties. Meta announced initial hardware partners such as Asus and Lenovo, as well as a partnership with Microsoft for a "limited edition" Xbox-branded Quest bundled with Xbox Wireless Controllers and Game Pass. Meta also stated that it was developing a "spatial app framework" to help port non-VR Android apps to Horizon OS, and that it was open to working with Google to support Play Store on Horizon OS—moves considered a parallel to Apple's support of iOS applications on visionOS.

In 2024, leaks by Meta revealed an upcoming Quest model known as the Quest 3S, which is expected to be a low-end variant of the Quest 3 designed to supplant the Quest 2. Quest 3s was unveiled on September 25, 2024, and released on October 15, 2024, as part of the third generation of the Meta Quest line, serving as a cheaper option for new and budget VR players.

=== Discontinued models ===
==== Oculus Rift ====
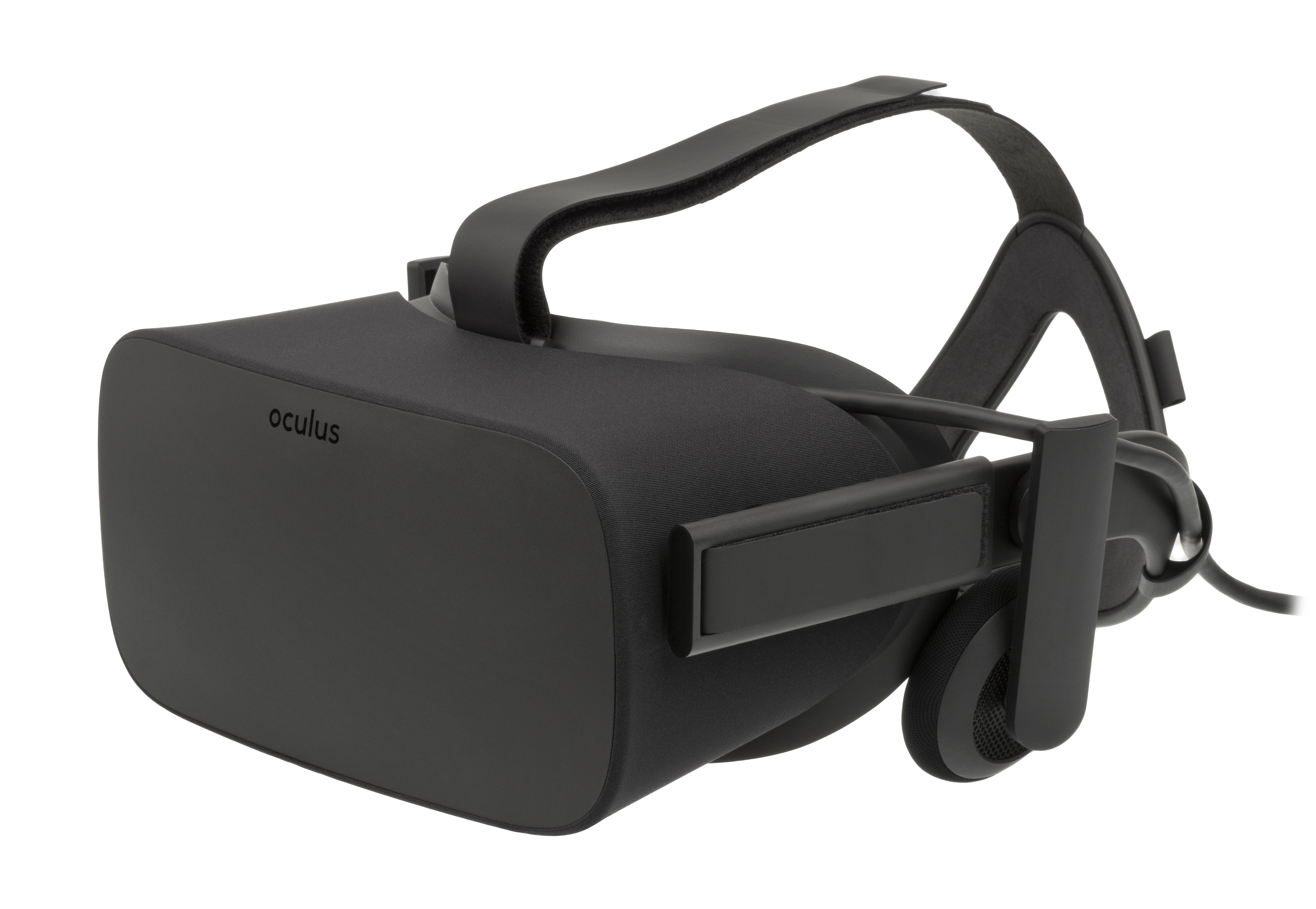
The original Oculus Rift

The Oculus Rift CV1, also known as simply the Oculus Rift, was the first consumer model of the Oculus Rift headset. It was released on March 28, 2016, in 20 countries, at a starting price of US$599. The 6,955 backers who received the Development Kit 1 prototype via the original Oculus Rift Kickstarter campaign were eligible to receive the CV1 model for free. On December 6, 2016, Oculus released motion controller accessories for the headset known as Oculus Touch.

==== Samsung Gear VR ====
In 2014, Samsung partnered with Oculus to develop the Gear VR, a VR headset accessory for Samsung Galaxy smartphones. It relies on the phone's display, which is viewed through lenses inside the headset. At Oculus Connect in September 2015, the Gear VR was announced for a consumer release in November; the initial model supported the Galaxy S6 and Galaxy S7 product lines, as well as the Galaxy Note 5.

==== Oculus Go ====
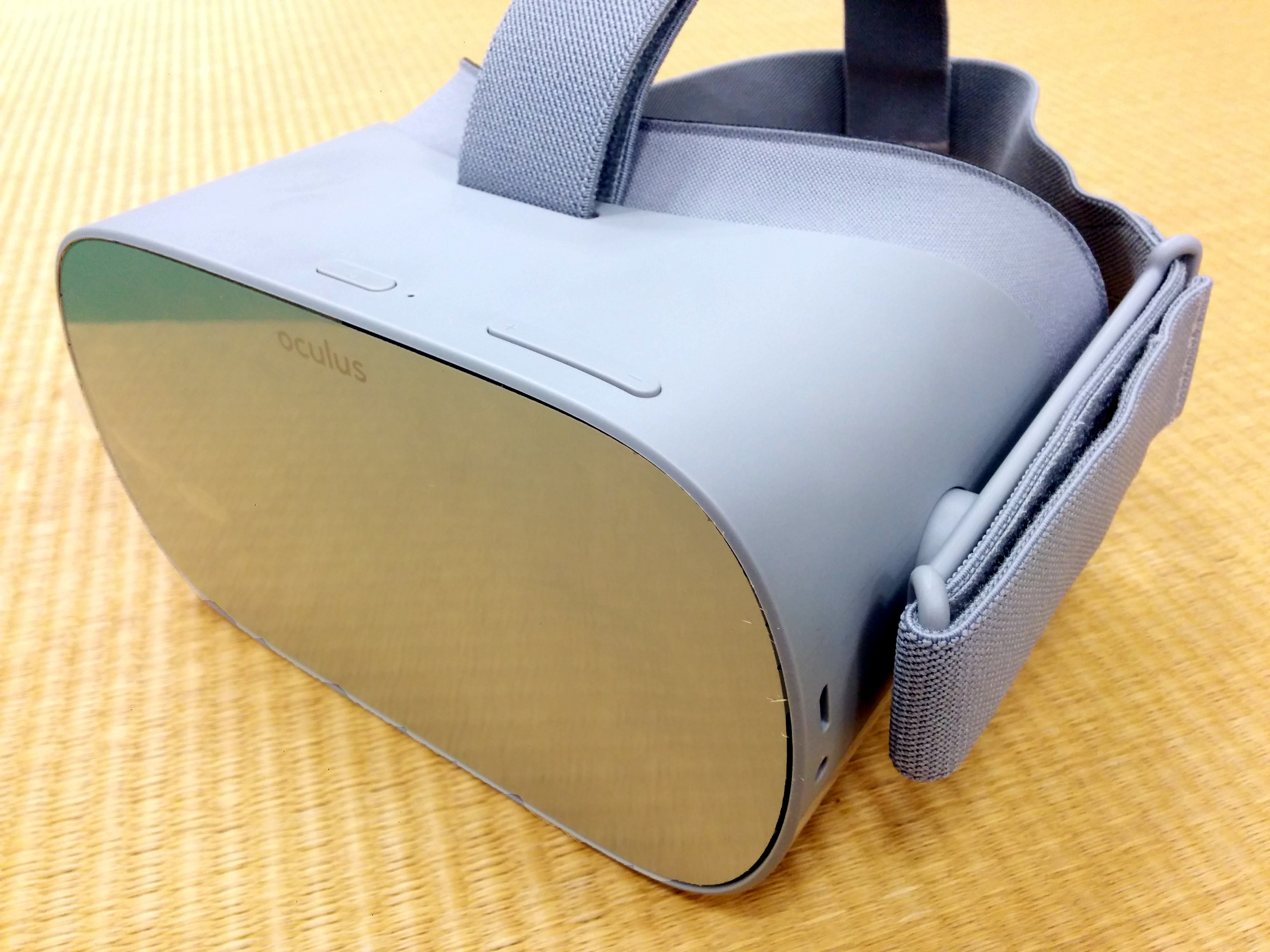
Oculus Go headset

On October 11, 2017, Oculus unveiled the Oculus Go, a mobile VR headset manufactured by Xiaomi (the device was released in the Chinese market as the Xiaomi Mi VR). Unlike the Oculus Rift, the Go is a standalone headset which is not dependent on a PC for operation. Unlike VR systems such as Cardboard, Daydream, and the Oculus co-developed Samsung Gear VR (where VR software is run on a smartphone inserted into a physical enclosure, and its screen is viewed through lenses), it contains its own dedicated display and mobile computing hardware. The headset includes a 5.5-inch 1440p fast-switching liquid-crystal display (LCD), integrated speakers with spatial audio and a headphone jack for external audio, a Qualcomm Snapdragon 821 system-on-chip, and 32 or 64 GB of internal storage. It runs an Android-based operating system with access to VR software via the Oculus Home user experience and app store, including games and multimedia apps. The Go includes a handheld controller reminiscent of one designed for the Gear VR, which uses relative motion tracking. The Oculus Go does not use positional tracking.

While official sales numbers have not been released, according to IDC the Oculus Go and Xiaomi Mi VR had sold nearly a quarter million units combined during the third quarter 2018, and in January 2019 market analysis firm SuperData estimated that over a million Oculus Go units had been sold since the device's launch. In his keynote at 2018's Oculus Connect developer conference, John Carmack revealed that the Go's retention rate was as high as the Rift's, something that nobody at the company had predicted. Carmack also noted that the Go had done especially well in Japan despite lacking internationalization support and the company not specifically catering to the Japanese market.

Oculus Go was declared end-of-life in June 2020, with software submissions to end in December 2020, and firmware support ending in 2022.

==== Oculus Rift S ====
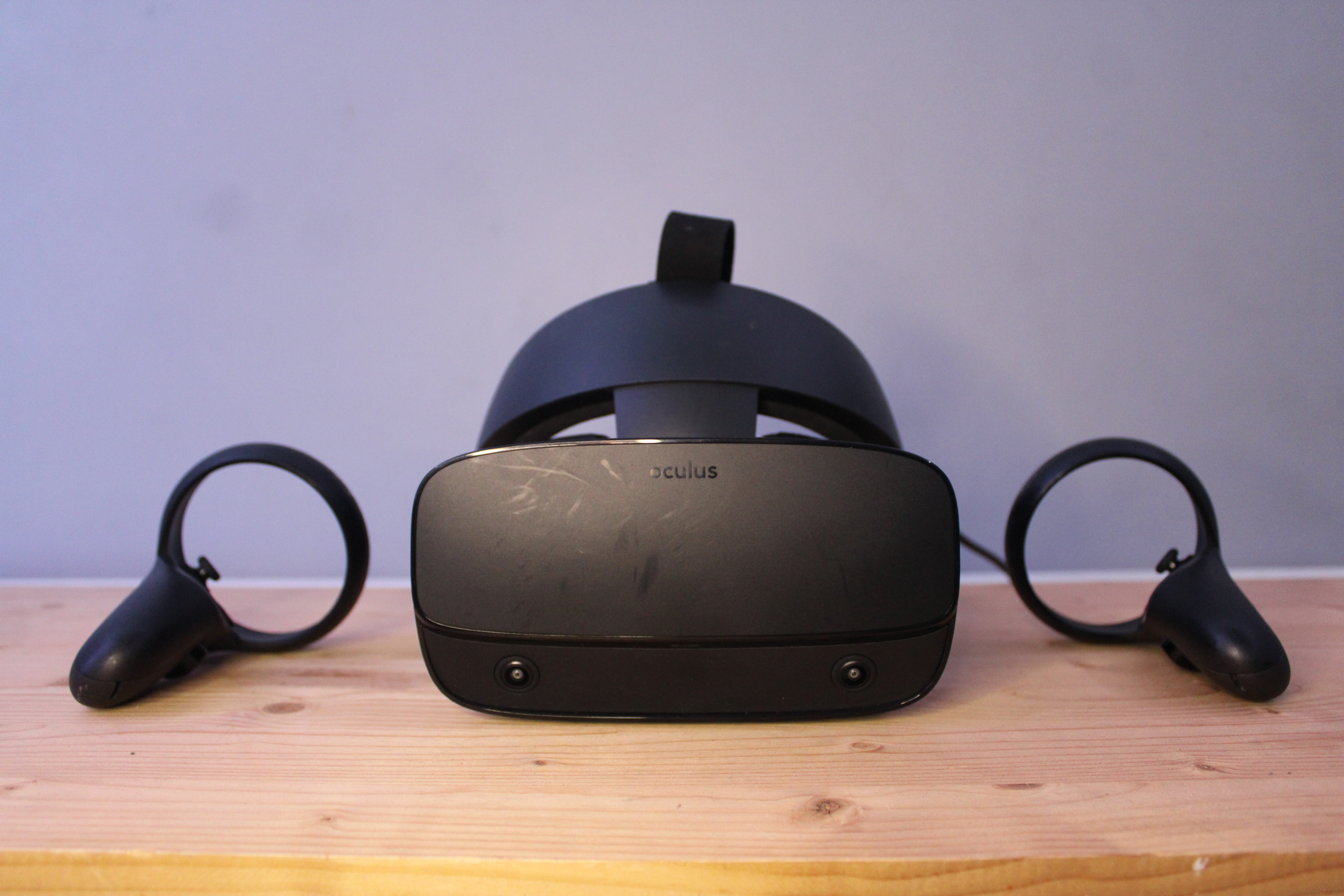
Oculus Rift S

On March 20, 2019, at the Game Developers Conference, Facebook announced the Oculus Rift S, a successor to the original Oculus Rift headset. It was co-developed with and manufactured by Lenovo, and launched at a price of US$399. The Rift S contains hardware features from the Oculus Go and Oculus Quest, including Oculus Insight, integrated speakers, and a new "halo" strap. The Rift S uses the same 1440p LCD and lenses as the Oculus Go (a higher resolution in comparison to the original model, but lower in comparison to Oculus Quest), running at 80 Hz, and is backwards compatible with all existing Oculus Rift games and software. Unlike the original Oculus Rift, it does not have hardware control for inter-pupillary distance.

In September 2020, Facebook announced it would be discontinuing the Oculus Rift S and in April 2021, shipments of the headset ceased.

==== Comparison ====
Model	Price	Optics	Display Size	Display Type	Refresh rate	Passthrough	Tracking capabilities	Store	Processor	RAM	Storage	Weight	Controllers	Battery Life	Availability	Release date
Oculus Rift	$399	Fresnel lenses	2 * 1080×1200	OLED	90Hz	-	-	Oculus Rift Store	-	-	-	470g	2 * Oculus Touch Controller (V1)	-	Discontinued	March 28, 2016
Oculus Go	$249	Fresnel lenses	1 * 1440×2560	LCD	60-72Hz	-	-	Oculus Go Store	Snapdragon 821	3GB	64GB	470g	1 * Oculus Go Controller	2–3 hours	Discontinued	May 1, 2018
Oculus Rift S	$399	Fresnel lenses	1 * 1440×2560	LCD	80Hz	Stereoscopic grayscale passthrough	-	Oculus Rift Store	-	-	-	570g	2 * Oculus Touch Controller (V2)	-	Discontinued	May 21, 2019
Oculus Quest	$499	Fresnel lenses	2 * 1440×1660	OLED	72Hz	Grayscale passthrough	Hand tracking	Quest Store	Snapdragon 835	4GB	128GB	570g	2 * Oculus Touch Controller (V2)	2–5 hours	Discontinued	May 21, 2019
Oculus/Meta Quest 2	$249	Fresnel lenses	1 * 3664×3800 (1832×1920 per eye)	LCD	72-120Hz	Stereoscopic grayscale passthrough	Hand tracking	Quest Store	Snapdragon XR2	6GB	128GB | 256GB	503g	2 * Oculus Touch Controller (V3)	2–3 hours	Discontinued	October 13, 2020
Meta Quest Pro	$1,000	Pancake lenses	2 * 1800x1920	Mini LED	72-90Hz	Stereoscopic color passthrough	Hand tracking, eye tracking, face tracking	Quest Store	Snapdragon XR2+	12GB	256GB	722g	2 * Meta Quest Touch Pro Controllers	2 hours	Discontinued	October 25, 2022
Meta Quest 3	$499	Pancake lenses	2 * 2064x2208	LCD	72-120Hz	Stereoscopic color passthrough	Hand tracking	Quest Store	Snapdragon XR2 Gen 2	8GB DRAM	128GB | 512GB	515g	2 * Touch Plus controllers	2–3 hours	Available	October 10, 2023
Meta Quest 3S	$299	Fresnel lenses	2 * 1832 x 1920	LCD	72-120Hz	Stereoscopic color passthrough	Hand tracking	Quest Store	Snapdragon XR2 Gen 2	8GB DRAM	128GB | 256GB	514g	2 * Touch Plus controllers	2–3 hours	Available	October 15, 2024

=== Smart glasses ===
In September 2021, Reality Labs and Ray-Ban announced Ray-Ban Stories, a collaboration on camera-equipped smart glasses that can upload video to Facebook. In the following years, additional AI glasses have been released through Reality Labs' partnership with EssilorLuxotica including a premium version featuring a small heads-up display.

== Divisions ==
=== Oculus Studios ===
Oculus Studios
- Type: Division
- Industry: Virtual reality, Video games
- Founded: 2020
- Founder: Palmer Luckey
- Headquarters: Menlo Park, California, U.S.
- Revenue: 1,896,000,000 ±500000 United States dollar (2023)
- Number of employees: 17,000 (2022)
- Parent: Meta Platforms
- Subsidiaries: Beat Games; BigBox VR; Ouro Interactive; Unit 2 Games; Camouflaj

Oculus Studios is a division of Meta that serves as an umbrella organization for its first-party game development studios such as Beat Games and Camouflaj.

==== Founding ====
Initially the division was more broadly focused on funding, publishing and giving technical advice to third & second party studios to create games and experiences for Oculus Rift. Meta pledged to invest more than US$500 million on Oculus Studios to make games and content. This period saw them build multi-game relationships with prominent studio partners in a second-party capacity, studios such as Insomniac Games, Twisted Pixel Games, Turtle Rock Studios, and Gunfire Games.

As focus moved away from the Rift and towards the very successful Meta Quest 2, the priority shifted to acquiring developers as first-party studios, so they could make exclusive games inhouse instead.

==== Acquisitions ====
Starting in 2020, Meta purchased both Beat Games (Beat Saber) and Sanzaru Games (Asgard's Wrath) and integrated them into Oculus Studios. Ready at Dawn, a game studio composed of former members of Naughty Dog and Blizzard Entertainment (and had also developed the Oculus Rift exclusive Lone Echo) were acquired in June 2020.

In 2021, Meta began a deliberate effort of buying up studios that had made strong sales on their Quest 2 platform. In April 2021, Downpour Interactive, the developer of the virtual reality FPS multiplayer game, Onward, were purchased. The team would migrate over to Oculus Studios, although the game would continue to receive updates on all supported VR platforms. In May 2021, Meta bought BigBox VR, the developers of the popular battle royale, Population One. In June 2021, Meta purchased Unit2 Games, the makers of Crayta, a free-to-play platform that allows players to create and share their games via Facebook Gaming. Finally in November 2021, Meta purchased the formerly Microsoft owned studio, Twisted Pixel Games. The developer had been a successful second-party studio for Meta since 2017, and had produced the VR games Wilson's Heart, B-Team, Defector, and Path of the Warrior, all exclusively for Oculus platforms.

Additionally, in October 2021, Meta announced they were purchasing Within, the studio behind the successful VR fitness app, Supernatural. It was stated they would continue to operate independently as part of Reality Labs. Later that year the FTC conducted a probe into the 400 million dollar deal. In July 2022, the FTC attempted to sue Meta, as it was felt with the purchase of the studios behind both Beat Saber and Supernatural, they would unfairly corner the VR fitness market. This legal action has blocked the purchase indefinitely. In February 2023 the FTC lawsuit was denied and the purchase of Within went ahead for Meta.

At the Meta Connect 2022 event in October, Meta announced that they had acquired Armature Studio and Camouflaj as new members of Oculus Studios. Armature had created the highly popular Quest 2 VR port of Resident Evil 4. Camouflaj were best known for making Republique, and the PSVR exclusive Iron Man VR for Sony - this deal would see them port the latter game to the Quest 2 platform.

On January 13, 2026, it was announced that Sanzaru Games, Twisted Pixel, and Armature Studio would be closed in Meta's effort to streamline and improve quality of Horizon OS and future VR HMDs, and help fund AI research and AR wearables.

In June of 2026, Within was spun off into an independent company named Supernatural Health, with plans to launch a new version of Supernatural in the fall.

=== Oculus Publishing ===
In 2023, Meta announced the formation of a new division called Oculus Publishing aimed at third-party content funding, development support, and marketing. According to Meta, Oculus Publishing has been involved in the publishing of 300 titles including Among Us VR, Bonelab, The Walking Dead: Saints & Sinners, and Blade & Sorcery: Nomad.

=== Oculus Story Studio ===
Oculus Story Studio was an original animated virtual-reality film studio that existed between 2014 and May 2017, which launched three films. The studio aimed to pioneer animated virtual reality filmmaking and educate, inspire, and foster community for filmmakers interested in VR. Oculus Story Studio was first launched publicly at the 2015 Sundance Film Festival, where it presented three VR films – Dear Angelica, Henry, and Lost. Despite generally positive reception and critical acclaim, the studio did not publish any other works and was closed in May 2017.

== Litigation ==
=== ZeniMax Media ===
Following Facebook's acquisition of Oculus VR, ZeniMax Media, the parent company of id Software and John Carmack's previous employer, sought legal action against Oculus, accusing the company of theft of intellectual property relating to the Oculus Rift due to Carmack's transition from id Software to Oculus. The case, ZeniMax v. Oculus, was heard in a jury trial in the United States District Court for the Northern District of Texas, and their verdict was reached in February 2017, finding that Carmack had taken code from ZeniMax and used it in developing the Oculus Rift's software, violating his non-disclosure agreement with ZeniMax, and Oculus' use of the code was considered copyright infringement. ZeniMax was awarded $500 million in the jury verdict, later reduced to $250 million by the presiding judge, and the case was resolved in December 2018 through a confidential settlement agreement.

=== Immersion Corporation ===
In May 2022, Immersion Corporation sued Meta Platforms for patent infringement relating to the use of vibration functions in their gaming controllers.

== See also ==
- HTC Vive
- Valve Index
- VirtualLink
