= Camouflaj =

American video game developer

- Type: Subsidiary
- Industry: Video games
- Founded: September 2011; 15 years ago
- Headquarters: Bellevue, Washington, U.S.
- Key people: Ryan Payton (studio head)
- Products: République; Iron Man VR; Batman: Arkham Shadow
- Owner: Meta Platforms (2022-present)
- Number of employees: 75
- Parent: Oculus Studios
- Website: camouflaj.com

Camouflaj is an American video game developer based in Bellevue, Washington. Founded in 2011 by Ryan Payton, the studio is most known for developing République, Iron Man VR, and Batman: Arkham Shadow. The company was acquired by Meta Platforms in 2022.

== History ==
The studio was founded in September 2011 by Ryan Payton, who had previously worked at Kojima Productions and 343 Industries. He left 343 Industries to found his own studio due to his lack of motivation working on Halo 4 and his desire of working on games that are of smaller scale. Seeing the success of mobile games such as Infinity Blade, the studio began pitching their next project named République to various publishers such as Bungie. With no partner willing to publish the game, the studio decided to crowdfund it through Kickstarter. The project was funded on May 11, 2012 with a total of $555,662, and it was released episodically starting with "Episode 1: Exordium" in December 2013. The studio also partnered with GungHo Online Entertainment in June 2015 to publish the game. République concluded with "Episode 5: Terminus" in March 2016.

At E3 2016, Payton met with the head of Marvel Games, Jay Ong, who expressed interest in collaborating with the studio to work on a virtual reality game. The VR project, Iron Man VR, was created with a team of more than 50 people. The game was released for PlayStation VR in July 2020. In late 2020, Meta Platforms approached Camouflaj for the development of a new project with a bigger budget and larger scope. Camouflaj then began pitching for a Batman game to Warner Bros. and DC Comics for six months. The project later became Batman: Arkham Shadow, with former members of Rocksteady Studios contributing to the project. In March 2022, the studio opened a second office in Kamakura, Japan. In October 2022, Meta Platforms announced that it had fully acquired the studio. Arkham Shadow was released in October 2024 to critical acclaim, and it won Best VR/AR Game at The Game Awards 2024 and Immersive Reality Game of the Year at the 28th Annual D.I.C.E. Awards.

In January 2026, Meta laid off around 10% of the staff in its Reality Labs division. The game studios Sanzaru, Twisted Pixel, and Armature were closed, and there was speculation that Camouflaj might also be affected. However, a Meta spokesperson confirmed that while Camouflaj was affected by the layoffs, leaving only "a handful of employees", the studio itself would not be closing.

== Games developed ==
Year	Title	Publisher	Genre
2013-2016	République	GungHo Online Entertainment	Action-adventure
2020	Iron Man VR	Sony Interactive Entertainment	First-person shooter
2024	Batman: Arkham Shadow	Oculus Studios	Action-adventure
