= Marvel's Iron Man VR =

2020 shooter video game developed by Camouflaj

- Developers: Camouflaj; Endeavor One (Quest)
- Publishers: Sony Interactive Entertainment (PS4); Oculus Studios (Quest)
- Director: Ryan Payton
- Engine: Unity
- Platforms: PlayStation 4; Meta Quest 2; Meta Quest Pro; Meta Quest 3; Meta Quest 3S
- Release: PlayStation VR; July 3, 2020; Meta Quest; November 3, 2022
- Genre: First-person shooter
- Mode: Single-player

Marvel's Iron Man VR is a virtual reality first-person shooter video game developed by Camouflaj and published by Sony Interactive Entertainment for the PlayStation 4. Released for the PlayStation VR headset, it is based on the Marvel Comics superhero Iron Man and inspired by the long-running comic book mythology and adaptations in other media. The game's story revolves around Iron Man's conflict with a mysterious computer hacker and terrorist known only as Ghost, who targets Tony Stark and his company while seeking revenge for the deaths caused by the weapons the company manufactured prior to Stark becoming Iron Man.

Gameplay is presented from a first-person perspective, calling on the player to navigate the game's virtual space by using the flying mechanics and weapon systems of the Iron Man armor to attack enemies primarily in aerial combat across several environments. Iron Man can freely navigate the different environments in the game accessed through a linear progression of different levels, interacting with characters, undertaking missions, and unlocking new armor upgrades by progressing through the main story or completing challenge modes outside of the story.

After a series of delays and a disruption in the game's production caused by the COVID-19 pandemic, the game was released for the PlayStation 4 through PlayStation VR on July 3, 2020 and received "mixed or average" reviews according to review aggregator Metacritic. Following Camouflaj's acquisition by Meta Platforms in 2022, the game was later released by Oculus Studios on the Meta Quest 2 under license from both Sony and Marvel.

== Gameplay ==
Marvel's Iron Man VR is an aerial shooter played from a first-person perspective, taking place across various global locales as Iron Man attempts to thwart his enemy Ghost and the various combat drones she employs to bring ruin to Tony Stark and his company. As a virtual reality game, it is played from a first-person perspective, employing the use of one PlayStation Move or Oculus Touch controller in each of the player's hands to allow control of Iron Man's palm-mounted repulsor weapons and flight stabilizers. Based on hand and head positioning of the PlayStation VR headset and Move controllers, the player can freely fly around the game's various environments in order to attack combat drones while also interacting with elements of the game map in order to do things like deactivate explosives, repair broken items or put out fires.

Environments can be navigated freely as opposed to employing elements of rail shooting, with the player in total control of roaming each game map by use of the Iron Man armor. The player uses the weapon systems of the armor including the repulsors and various auxiliary weapons (such as small missiles or larger-scale explosives) to defeat enemies, and can also employ melee attacks that are given additional power through the use of the armor's jet propulsion systems. Successful completion of missions earns the player up to five "research points" based on their received score-based star rating, which can then be used to purchase upgrades to the Iron Man armor that can be crafted and installed in Tony Stark's garage between missions. The upgrades can augment the capabilities of the Iron Man armor while also adding new auxiliary weapons that have different effectiveness in different combat scenarios, and the player can create and choose between two different armor loadouts while in the garage featuring different upgrades and armor shaders ("decos").

Cutscenes which progress the story are also presented from the first-person perspective, allowing the player to interact with objects and look around freely while story material is taking place around them. Challenge modes consist of racing and combat-based exercises taking place through the game's pre-existing environments, giving the player an additional opportunity to earn research points they can use to upgrade the armor.

== Synopsis ==
=== Characters and setting ===
Marvel's Iron Man VR features an ensemble cast of characters drawn from the history of Iron Man and Avengers comics. Tony Stark (voiced by Josh Keaton) is a billionaire industrialist and weapons manufacturer who became a superhero after a life-changing experience, wherein he was captured and held hostage by terrorists in Afghanistan. With help from fellow captive Ho Yinsen, he built the first iteration of the Iron Man armor and managed to escape his captors, but failed to save Yinsen, who was killed during the escape. After his return to the United States, Stark turned his life around: he announced that his company, Stark Industries, would stop manufacturing weapons, and revealed himself as the superhero Iron Man.

The events of the game take place five years after Stark first became Iron Man. By this point, he has established himself as a world-renowned hero. Stark is aided in his endeavors by the recently appointed Stark Industries CEO Pepper Potts (Jennifer Hale), and his sentient artificial intelligence assistant F.R.I.D.A.Y. (Leila Birch). The game features another A.I. called "the Gunsmith" (also voiced by Keaton), which was made in Stark's image and used to assist him in designing weapons before he became Iron Man. Throughout the game, Iron Man's adventures bring him into contact with several supporting characters, including S.H.I.E.L.D. Director Nick Fury (Ike Amadi) and Deputy Director Maria Hill (Ali Hillis); Stark's relationship with Fury was strained after the former stopped supplying S.H.I.E.L.D. with weapons, but the two nonetheless respect and admire each other. Iron Man also comes into conflict with supervillains including Ghost (Chantelle Barry) and the Living Laser (Leonardo Nam).

Iron Man VR depicts fictional locations and entities adapted from both the Marvel universe and the Marvel Cinematic Universe, including a Stark Tower based in Shanghai, Tony Stark's beachfront home in Malibu, California, and a S.H.I.E.L.D. Helicarrier (described as Stark's final project before Stark Industries stopped manufacturing weapons). There are also in-game references to Iron Man being a member of the Avengers, including blueprints of Stark Tower's transformation into the Avengers Tower that the player can find. The downtown Shanghai level features advertisements for other fictional companies in the Marvel Universe, such as the Roxxon Energy Corporation and Advanced Idea Mechanics. Oscorp can also be seen in-game, and the loading screens offer information on the company's background, revealing that it was founded by both Norman Osborn and Otto Octavius (a reference to the story of Oscorp's foundation in Marvel's Spider-Man).

=== Plot ===
Shortly after revealing himself to the world as the superhero Iron Man, Tony Stark decides to fully move on from his former life as a weapons dealer by deactivating the "Gunsmith", an A.I. modeled after him that was designed to assist Stark with manufacturing weapons and planning out battle tactics. While breaking the news to the Gunsmith, Stark reveals that the A.I.'s "retirement" will consist of "full internet privileges" and that his consciousness will continue to exist.

Five years later, Stark has cemented himself as a world-renowned hero and member of the Avengers, having walked away entirely from weapons manufacturing, much to the dismay of S.H.I.E.L.D. Director Nick Fury. After appointing his former assistant Pepper Potts as the new CEO of Stark Industries—now a clean energy company—Stark is attacked aboard a company jet by a mysterious computer hacker known as "Ghost", who uses a tech suit that allows her to fly and to phase in and out of solid matter. Ghost blames Stark for all the deaths caused by his weapons over the years and attempts to exact revenge by reviving a series of Stark-manufactured combat drones and having them attack Stark Industries' assets across the globe. Blindsided by the effectiveness of Ghost's initial attack, a desperate Stark reactivates the Gunsmith due to his instrumental role in designing the drones now used by Ghost, much to the dismay of his current A.I. assistant F.R.I.D.A.Y., who has been modeled to exemplify Stark's new, more heroic aspirations and goals.

After the Stark Tower in Shanghai is attacked, Iron Man races there to find Ghost waiting for him, who expresses her desire to seek justice for "Tim Shung", a name that neither Stark nor F.R.I.D.A.Y. recognize. When Iron Man is overwhelmed by Ghost's drones, the Gunsmith revives his powerful unibeam weapon, allowing him to destroy them. Meanwhile, Ghost's attacks catch the attention of S.H.I.E.L.D., and Fury calls Stark to the Helicarrier to offer intel on her, just as Ghost attacks, but is driven off by Iron Man and the S.H.I.E.L.D. personnel. Stark then learns that a former disgruntled Stark Industries employee named Arthur Park has been revived by Ghost and provided with laser armor technology to assist her in her vendetta against Stark.

Ghost later attacks Stark's home in Malibu, prompting the Gunsmith to employ orbital satellites to destroy her contingent of drones, while causing a massive amount of collateral damage. F.R.I.D.A.Y. leaves in protest of Tony's continued association with the Gunsmith, whom she sees as embodying the dangerous impulses of his former, pre-heroic lifestyle. After tracking Park, now calling himself the "Living Laser", and Ghost to a Roxxon facility in Kazakhstan, Iron Man defeats them both, but the Gunsmith commandeers his armor to kill Ghost against Stark's wishes. He resists and subsequently fires the Gunsmith, while Ghost escapes during the chaos.

Stark returns home to find F.R.I.D.A.Y. who reassures him and refocuses him on the mission at-hand. After the Living Laser launches a solo attack on the S.H.I.E.L.D. Helicarrier, Iron Man defeats him and discovers the location of the base he and Ghost have been using: the same cave in Afghanistan where Stark built his first Iron Man armor to escape from his terrorist captors. Returning to the cave and finding the original armor still inside, Iron Man is attacked by Ghost, who forcefully removes the arc reactor keeping him alive from his chest. As Stark struggles through a "trial" Ghost has planned, he learns that she was orphaned as a child by an attack involving Stark weapons, and that her desire for revenge led her to correspond online with a faceless Stark Industries employee: Tim Shung. In her eyes, Shung was a hero and a whistleblower who selflessly revealed the extent of Stark's criminality before allegedly being killed by the company. F.R.I.D.A.Y. helps recover the arc reactor and Iron Man defeats Ghost, who is subsequently imprisoned on the S.H.I.E.L.D. Helicarrier.

Later, Stark and Pepper realize that "Tim Shung" is an anagram for "Gunsmith", who reveals himself that he used Ghost's vendetta against Stark to achieve his own goal: have Stark Industries produce weapons again, believing the world was safer with Stark weapons on the market. Realizing he cannot go up against Gunsmith using his regular armor that the rogue A.I. has access to, Stark retrofits the newly recovered Mark I armor and returns to his home to fight the Gunsmith. There, he reluctantly allies himself with an escaped Ghost, who manages to go through an impenetrable barrier surrounding the mansion erected by the Gunsmith. Using the information that Ghost finds about the A.I.'s weaknesses, Iron Man eliminates a giant construct of the Gunsmith wearing an advanced version of his armor. With the Gunsmith defeated, Ghost ends her temporary truce with Stark and departs.

Months later, Iron Man and Pepper—now in her own Rescue armor—are called into space by Nick Fury to examine a S.H.I.E.L.D. orbital satellite that has become suspiciously unresponsive.

== Development ==
The game was revealed in March 2019 during SIE's first "State of Play" online presentation. The game features a new suit for Iron Man, referred to as the "Impulse Armor", designed by comic book artist Adi Granov. Granov became closely associated with Iron Man after serving as the artist on the "Extremis" story arc released in 2005–2006, and has since contributed design work to the first Iron Man feature film. Granov previously collaborated with Marvel Games on a new costume featured in Marvel's Spider-Man.

During 2020, the game was delayed due to the COVID-19 pandemic, until July 3.

== Release ==
Marvel's Iron Man VR was released worldwide on July 3, 2020, exclusively for PlayStation VR. Customers who pre-ordered the game were given instant access to some unlockable, in-game features, including an exclusive theme for the PlayStation 4 dashboard as well as instant unlocks for four shaders of the game's rendition of the Iron Man armor, referred to as "decos." The decos included with the pre-order include "origin armor" (inspired by the metallic look of the original Iron Man armor as seen in the character's first appearance), "vintage armor" (based on the character's "classic" design introduced in 1976), "silver centurion armor" (based on the design popularized in the "Armor Wars" story), and "ultraviolet armor" (an original creation designed by game developer Camouflaj).

The game also released a "digital deluxe edition," which featured another custom PlayStation 4 dashboard theme, the full soundtrack of the game, 12 instantly unlocked research points to use in upgrading the armor in-game, as well as four additional custom armor decos. These include "golden Avenger armor" (an all-gold color variation which debuted in an early appearance, and which persisted into early issues of The Avengers), "black centurion armor" (based on the design which debuted during the Marvel NOW! comics relaunch), "sun stinger armor" (based on a design appearing in The Invincible Iron Man), and "stealth armor" (based on the armor depicted in a late 1981 issue of the character's ongoing series).

Following timed exclusivity on Sony platforms, Meta Platforms announced in October 2022 that it had acquired a series of VR game development studios including Camouflaj. Soon afterward, Iron Man VR was released for the Meta Quest 2 headset under the publication banner of Oculus Studios, in collaboration with VR games developer Endeavor One. The Quest version of the game took player feedback into account in reworking some elements of the original game including the visuals, controls, loading times and some elements of the game's storytelling, according to a presentation by Camouflaj made at the 2023 Game Developers Conference.

== Reception ==
Reception

Aggregate scores
Aggregator	Score
Metacritic	73/100
OpenCritic	66% recommend

Review scores
Publication	Score
Destructoid	7/10
Game Informer	7.5/10
GamePro	76/100
GameSpot	6/10
GamesRadar+	3/5
Hardcore Gamer	2.5/5
IGN	7/10
Jeuxvideo.com	13/20
PlayStation Official Magazine – UK	8/10
Push Square	8/10

According to review aggregator Metacritic, Marvel's Iron Man VR received "mixed or average reviews". Fellow review aggregator OpenCritic assessed that the game received strong approval, being recommended by 66% of critics.

=== Sales ===
Iron Man VR debuted in second place on the weekly UK video games sales chart for the week of 4 July. For the week ending 11 July, the game was in ninth place on the weekly UK video games sales chart. In September 2020, it was amongst the 10 most downloaded PS VR games in the USA and Europe. Iron Man VR was also in the top 10 of the most downloaded PS VR games in the USA, Canada and Europe in October 2020. The game was the 10th most-downloaded PS VR title in the United States and Canada in 2020. In July 2021, Iron Man VR was the 8th most downloaded PS VR game in Europe. In December 2023 and October 2024, it was again in the top 10 of the most downloaded PS VR games in the USA, Canada and Europe.

=== Awards ===
It was nominated for Best VR/AR at The Game Awards 2020.

== Future ==
Addressing speculation of the game's connection with Insomniac Games' Marvel's Spider-Man games, director Ryan Payton stated that despite the developer's intent to tell a standalone narrative, that "there are definitely opportunities to link the worlds", and that he hoped that the two game series could build to a crossover in future installments.
