= République (video game) =

- Developer: Camouflaj
- Publishers: NA: GungHo Online Entertainment; PAL: NIS America
- Director: Ryan Payton
- Producers: Darci Morales; Aaron Whiting
- Designer: Ryan Payton
- Artist: Alexei Tylevich
- Writers: Brendan Murphy; Ryan Payton
- Composer: Zinc LeMone
- Engine: Unity
- Platforms: iOS, Android, Microsoft Windows, OS X, PlayStation 4, Oculus Go, Oculus Quest, Oculus Rift, Stadia, Nintendo Switch, PlayStation VR
- Release: Episode 1: iOS; WW: December 19, 2013 Android; WW: October 22, 2014 Microsoft Windows & OS X; WW: February 26, 2015; Episode 2: iOS; WW: May 2, 2014 Android; WW: October 22, 2014 Microsoft Windows & OS X; WW: February 26, 2015; Episode 3: iOS; WW: October 20, 2014 Android; WW: October 22, 2014 Microsoft Windows & OS X; WW: February 26, 2015; Episode 4: iOS, Android, Microsoft Windows & OS X; WW: December 17, 2015; Episode 5: iOS, Android, Microsoft Windows & OS X; WW: March 22, 2016; Full Game: PlayStation 4; NA: March 22, 2016; PAL: March 25, 2016; Anniversary Edition: Nintendo Switch, PlayStation 4, & PlayStation VR; WW: March 10, 2022
- Genres: Action-adventure, stealth
- Mode: Single-player

République is an episodic action-adventure stealth video game developed by Camouflaj and Logan Games and published by GungHo Online Entertainment. The game was originally released for iOS devices but has since expanded to Android, Microsoft Windows and OS X. A PlayStation 4 version, containing all five episodes, was released on March 22, 2016, while a version for the Stadia cloud gaming service was released on September 15, 2020. A VR version debuted on the Oculus Go, followed by a release onto Oculus Quest in July 2019, and Steam on 15 June 2020 (for HTC Vive, Oculus Rift and Valve Index) and Oculus Go. On June 14, 2021, Camouflaj announced an Anniversary Edition of the game for the Nintendo Switch, PlayStation 4 and PlayStation VR which was released on March 10, 2022.

== Gameplay ==
Players communicate with the main character, Hope, through their phone or computer, in order to help her escape. The player controls surveillance cameras in the fictional totalitarian state or corporate republic of République in order to monitor Hope's actions, as well as hack into various electronic devices.

The interface that the player must use is the "OMNI View" software, which allows them to lock and unlock doors, distract patrolling enemies, and obtain information. In some situations, the player must upgrade their OMNI View to higher versions, enabling them to access areas and nodes with stronger security, In the OS X and Windows versions, players will be able to access multiple cameras at once.

Throughout the game, Player finds collectables throughout the levels, which are game cartridges and banned books. The games are Easter eggs, which feature real-life Indie games that were popular at the time, including Papers, Please, Year Walk, Bastion, The Room, Super Hexagon, VVVVVV, and more. The banned books are also based on real-life books such as Animal Farm, Frankenstein, Brave New World, and more.

== Plot ==
République is set in an unnamed totalitarian state ruled by the authoritarian Headmaster/Overseer Kenichiro Treglazov (Dwight Schultz). The society is built around Treglazov's ideology, which is disseminated through his writings and enforced through pervasive surveillance and the Prizrak, a heavily controlled security force. Much of the story takes place within Metamorphosis. At this secluded facility, adolescents known as Pre-Cals (short for pre-calibrated) are raised, educated and subjected to experiments intended to serve Treglazov's larger plans. They are raised from birth in total isolation from the outside world and are conditioned to follow the Headmaster's rules.

The story follows Hope (Rena Strober), a teenage Pre-Cal designated 390-H. Unlike a conventional protagonist, Hope is assisted by the Player, who communicates with her through a mobile phone and observes the facility through its surveillance cameras.

=== Episode 1: Exordium ===
Hope secretly contacts the Player from within Metamorphosis and begs for help, fearing that she will be "erased" through a process known as Recalibration. She has been accused of possessing and altering a banned book containing writings by Daniel Zager (David Hayter), a former Prizrak guard turned resistance fighter who opposes Treglazov’s regime. Unfortunately, Zager was killed before the events of the game, but his writings and recordings (known as Manifesto and Zager Tapes respectively) continue to influence the people attempting to resist Treglazov.

Hope is confronted by Mireille Prideaux (Jennifer Hale), the administrator responsible for the Pre-Cals. Mireille confiscates Hope's possessions and sends her to solitary confinement. Hope's phone is subsequently discovered by Frederick Cooper (James Holloway), a Prizrak guard who has become disillusioned with the regime. Cooper contacts the Player and agrees to help Hope escape.

With Cooper's assistance, the Player guides Hope out of confinement and through Metamorphosis. As she progresses through the facility, Hope discovers evidence of the regime's censorship and the disturbing treatment of the Pre-Cals. Cooper continues to provide reliable information to the Player about the facility and helps Hope avoid the Prizrak.

Hope is eventually caught by Mireille and is sent into a room for interrogation. Suddenly, a Prizrak wearing a helmet tases Mireille, allowing Hope to escape.

=== Episode 2: Metamorphosis ===
Hope makes her way into the facility's library, where she hopes to meet the Librarian, a secret ally who disapproves of Treglazov’s belief in banning books. Hope learns that the Librarian had secretly distributed Zager's Manifesto to the Pre-Cals. Treglazov eventually discovers this and orders Quinn Derringer (Khary Payton), the head of the Prizrak, to kill the Librarian.

After mourning the death of her ally, Hope explores the library and discovers evidence that the Pre-Cals are connected to a much larger project involving genetics, data storage and Treglazov's plans for an event known as the "Arrival." She ultimately reaches an elevator that appears to provide a route to the surface, only to encounter Derringer in the process.

=== Episode 3: Ones and Zeroes ===
After a narrow escape from Derringer, Hope finds another elevator that leads to the surface, but is guarded by two Prizrak officers. She then encounters Mattie Sade, editor of the Morning Bell, a state-run propaganda newspaper company. She agrees to help Hope as she has a complex relationship with the regime. She instructs Hope to hack into the facility’s computer networks to gain access to Prizrak’s database. The plan is to find incriminating information about the two Prizrak, in hopes they will get into trouble, giving an opportunity for Hope to enter the elevator.

The investigation reveals that the Prizrak are recruited and controlled through fabricated criminal records and other forms of coercion. After publishing the incriminating articles, Derringer has the two Prizrak arrested, giving Hope the chance to enter the elevator. However, an altercation occurs at the elevator where Derringer confronts the Prizrak wearing a helmet (the same officer who assisted Hope in Episode 1), who is revealed to be Cooper. As Derringer drags Cooper into custody, Hope tearfully enters the elevator.

=== Episode 4: God's Acre ===
During the escape, Hope becomes disillusioned with the Player's methods and abandons the phone through which they have communicated. The phone is subsequently discovered by another girl from the facility. The story shifts from Hope to a girl identified only as 390, a Mirror created as part of the same experimental program that produced Hope. After finding Hope's abandoned phone, 390 becomes the Player's new point of contact.

Unlike Hope, 390 has little understanding of the outside world and possesses a more innocent, childlike personality. She has also been separated from the other Mirrors after Daniel Zager's intervention at Metamorphosis. With the facility in turmoil, 390 finds herself outside the main complex in an area known as God's Acre.

The place is guarded by Mammoth, a lanky giant with a dual personality. The Player guides 390 through the grounds, where she discovers laboratories, gardens and other areas connected to the Mirror project. The experience reveals more about the relationship between the Mirrors and the Pre-Cals and the biological research being conducted by Treglazov.

In the midst of her exploration, 390 eventually encounters Zager, who faked his death and reunites with Mireille, who has been secretly working with him. Meanwhile, Treglazov's forces are attempting to regain control of the facility.

390 eventually finds herself confronted by Treglazov. He recognises her as another product of the Mirror program and kills her, taking the phone from her. The phone eventually finds its way back to Hope, restoring the Player's connection with her.

=== Episode 5: Terminus ===
Hope is brought back into Metamorphosis and delivered to Treglazov. Before he can carry out his plans for her, Daniel Zager unexpectedly reveals that he is still alive and launches a coordinated attack on the facility. A series of explosions severely damages Metamorphosis, creating enough chaos for Hope to escape.

Hope finds Mireille and Zager hiding within the damaged facility. The two resistance leaders offer different plans for reaching Terminus, the central system connected to Treglazov's larger project. Hope must decide which of them to trust.

If she follows Mireille's plan, Hope works to remove the fabricated criminal records that Treglazov has used to control members of the Prizrak. Mireille reveals that her identity is not what it appears to be and explains her own history with the resistance against Treglazov. If Hope follows Zager's plan, she instead assists members of the Prizrak who have turned against the regime. Both approaches ultimately clear a path toward Terminus.

Hope reaches Terminus and disables its systems, causing the facility's central operations to fail. Derringer catches up with her and attempts to stop her, only to fall to his death. Mireille, Zager and Cooper then help Hope leave the damaged facility, which is finally revealed to be a massive, self-contained pyramid fortress built out in the open ocean.

On the surface, Treglazov is commencing the Arrival, which is the grand, public unveiling of Metamorphosis to the rest of the world. The plan was to introduce Metamorphosis on the global stage by blackmailing the world's leaders, proving he held all their data, and establishing his facility as the ultimate, unchallengeable global superpower. With the Terminus destroyed, all the stolen global data and information about the Mirrors and Pre-Cals are gone, leaving Hope as the last remaining repository of the data he needs.

Treglazov desperately attempts to persuade Hope to return to him, while Mireille, Zager and Cooper offer her another means of escape. Hope ultimately refuses to allow either side to control her future and makes a final decision of her own. She jumps into the open ocean and presumably sinks to her death.

== Development ==
Ryan Payton, founder of Camouflaj, initiated the project because he wanted to "stop complaining about the lack of real games on mobile and start making one". The idea for Hope came about when he was performing a thought experiment about how to make Love Plus for a Western audience. Payton cites Nineteen Eighty-Four as a major influence on the atmosphere. The game also draws inspiration from Metal Gear, the first Resident Evil, and Demon's Souls. The central themes are "voyeurism, paranoia, censorship, and control". Logan co-founder Alexei Tylevich serves as art director; Logan focused on visual development while Camouflaj handled the gameplay and systems.

On April 11, 2012, Camouflaj launched a Kickstarter crowdfunding campaign to raise $500,000 to help with development costs. The project was funded on May 11, 2012, with a total of $555,662.

== Reception ==
Aggregate review scores
Game	Metacritic
République	PS4: 72/100
Episode 1: Exordium	iOS: 77/100; PC: 77/100
Episode 2: Metamorphosis	iOS: 79/100
Episode 3: Ones and Zeroes	iOS: 75/100
Episode 4: God's Acre	PC: 63/100
Episode 5: Terminus	PC: 69/100

=== Episode 1: Exordium ===
Episode 1: Exordium received "generally favorable" reviews, according to review aggregator Metacritic.

=== Episode 2: Metamorphosis ===
Episode 2: Metamorphosis received "generally favorable" reviews, according to Metacritic.

=== Episode 3: Ones and Zeroes ===
Episode 3: Ones and Zeroes received "generally favorable" reviews, according to Metacritic.

=== Episode 4: God's Acre ===
Episode 4: God's Acre received "mixed or average" reviews, according to Metacritic.

=== Episode 5: Terminus ===
Episode 5: Terminus received "mixed or average" reviews, according to Metacritic.
