= Maestro (2024 video game) =

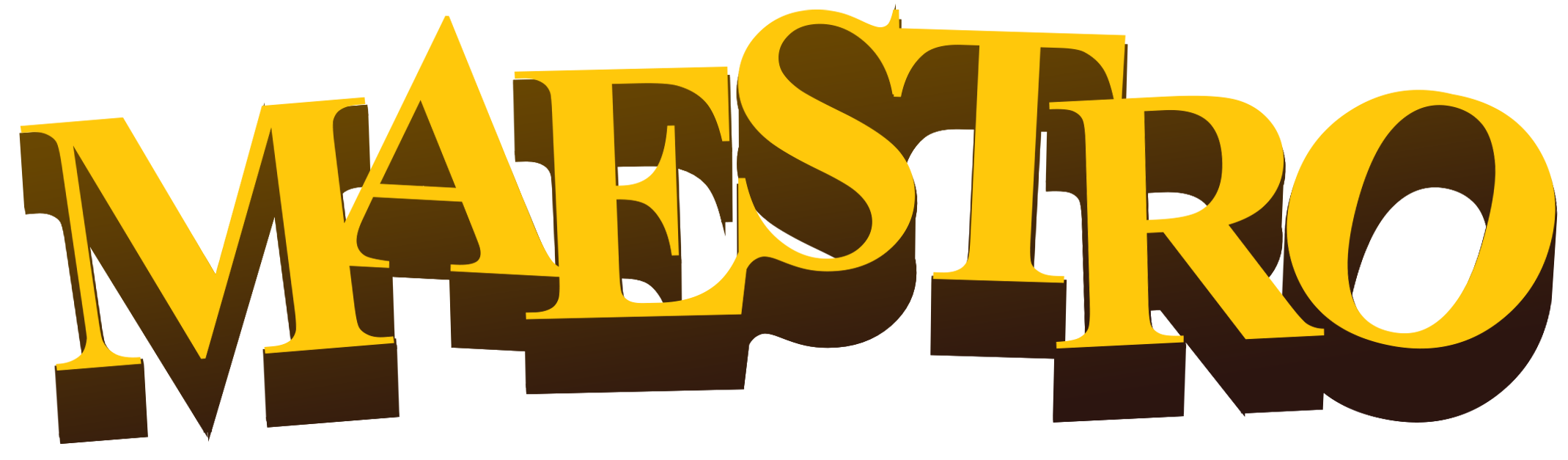
- Developer: Double Jack
- Publisher: Double Jack
- Platforms: Meta Quest 2, Meta Quest 3, Meta Quest Pro, Nintendo Switch, Nintendo Switch 2, Pico Neo 3, Pico 4, PlayStation 5, PlayStation VR2
- Release: Oct 17, 2024
- Genre: Rhythm
- Mode: Single-player

Maestro is an indie virtual reality rhythm game developed and published by Double Jack. It involves simulating conducting a group of musicians such as an orchestra or brass band, making movements with a virtual baton, commanding them to start and stop playing, changing the instruments dynamics and so on.

The game was released in October 2024 for Steam VR, Meta Quest and on the following year for PlayStation 5, being supported in virtual reality headsets such as Quest 2, Quest 3 and Quest Pro, Pico 4 and PlayStation VR2. It is included in the Meta Horizon+ subscription on Meta Horizon Store.

On September 17th, 2026, Double Jack released a version for Nintendo Switch and Nintendo Switch 2, thus making it non-VR compatible for the first time. The new release includes a new song, "Ashes on the Fire", from Attack on Titan, which was released as a paid DLC for other platforms on August 20th. A demo version, for both platforms, is available since August 14th.

== Development ==
Developer Double Jack is based in Paris. The game's first demo, with the name Maestro: The Masterclass, was released on August 18th, 2022, at that moment available for Oculus Quest and Meta Quest Pro, becoming viral on TikTok. The game continued to be developed for over two years, received investment from the Indie VR Fund in 2023. Wild Sheep Studio was contracted by Double Jack to work on the VR version of Maestro after the cancellation of Wild, making Maestro the first product shipped by Wild Sheep Studio. On the next year, the game was released, in October 17th, 2024.

On June 23rd, 2026, Double Jack teased the upcoming updates, including Expert mode, a better scoring system, and an Attack on Titan DLC. One month later, it was revealed that the song will be "Ashes on the Fire".

== Gameplay ==
In Maestro, players use their hands to control musicians playing in an orchestra.

The game is designed for virtual reality headsets and the usage of motion controllers is optional, as hand tracking is also supported. The player can use their bare hands or hold any kind of object for great immersion, such as a pen or a chopstick.

== Songs list ==
The base game comes with 15 songs, from composers such as Wagner, Orff, Saint-Saëns, Dvořák, Verdi, Prokofiev, Stravinsky, Mussorgsky, Ellington, Levy, Prima, Beethoven, Tchaikovsky, Mozart, Vivaldi and Mendelssohn, with extra music, including contemporary songs such as "Hedwig's Theme" from Harry Potter, being available as 5 different DLCs.

Excerpt from Maestro: The Masterclass trailer, illustrating the gameplay.

=== Base game ===
Composer	Song
Wagner	Ride of the Valkyries
Orff	Carmina Burana
Saint Saens	Danse Macabre
Dvorak	From The New World
Verdi	Messa Da Requiem
Prokofiev	The Dance Of The Knights
Stravinsky	The Rite of Spring
Mussorgsky	Night on Bald Mountain
Ellington	Caravan
Levy	Whiplash
Prima	Sing Sing Sing
Beethoven	Symphony No. 5
Tchaikovsky	Swan Lake
Mozart	Figaro's Wedding
Mendelssohn	The Hebrides
Vivaldi	Winter

=== DLCs ===
DLCs per release order, all paid, except when mentioned.

==== Secret Sorcery ====
Composer	Song
John Williams	Hedwig's Theme (from Harry Potter)
Paul Dukas	The Sorcerer's Apprentice (from Fantasia)
Edvard Grieg	In the Hall of the Mountain King
Hector Berlioz	Symphonie fantastique
Manuel de Falla	El amor brujo

==== Doom Bound ====
Composer	Song
Djawadi	Main Theme (from Game of Thrones)
Shore	The Bridge of Khazad Dum (from The Lord of the Rings)
Offenbach	Orpheus in the Underworld: Can Can
Shostakovich	Symphony No. 10
Liszt	Totentanz

==== Duel of the Fates ====
Composer	Song
John Williams	Duel of the Fates (from Star Wars: Episode I – The Phantom Menace)

==== La Crème de la Crème (free DLC) ====
Composer	Song
Bizet	Toreador Song (from Carmen)
Mozart	Dies Irae (from Requiem)
Beethoven	Ode to Joy (from Symphony No. 9)
Holst	Mars, Bringer Of War (from The Planets)
Brahms	Hungarian Dance No. 5

==== All Aboard! ====
Songs with pirate theme.

Composer	Song
Zimmer & Badelt	He's a Pirate (from Pirates of the Caribbean)
Zimmer	Jack Sparrow (from Pirates of the Caribbean)
Unknown Author	Wellerman
Rimski-Korsakov	The Shipwreck (from Scheherazade)
Vaughan-Williams	A Sea Symphony (Overture)

==== Attack on Titan ====
Includes two songs from Attack on Titan.

Composer	Song
Kohta Yamamoto	Attack on Titan (from Attack on Titan)
Hiroyuki Sawano	Ashes on the Fire (from Attack on Titan)

== Reception ==
Reception

Aggregate score
Aggregator	Score
Metacritic	Meta Quest: 93/100

Maestro received "universal acclaim" reviews according to Metacritic. In 2024, it won the Game of the Year recognition in Meta Horizon Store and was nominated as VR Game of the Year on The Steam Awards of 2024. In 2025, it was nominated as XR Game of the Year by AIXR XR Awards and chosen as one of the games in the 2025 PICO Store Annual Awards.

UploadVR gave it 4.5 out of 5, citing "Maestro is a breath of fresh air compared to every other VR rhythm game I've played over the years." Impulse Gamer gave the game a 5 out of 5 score, calling it "a must have game if you yearn for Guitar Hero but from a conductor perspective". Gaming Nexus gave it 8.5 out of 10, saying "Maestro puts the hand tracking of the Meta Quest 3 to the test, and nails it. With song familiarity, unlocks galore, and a simple, yet fun and challenging interface, this is a game you don't want to pass up. Even if you're not a musician, you'll be pleased with the hand tracking by itself, and that's going to get Maestro a lot of roses. Bravo." Digital Chumps gave it 9.5 out of 10, pointing that it "is quite approachable for a rhythm title" and that "comes with the full musical experience that will keep you playing for hours".

The game sold at least 150,000 copies for the Quest platform, according to the number of people who unlocked at least one achievement on it; at least 250,000 users tried the free demo version.

=== Awards ===
Year	Award	Category	Result	Ref.
2024	Meta Horizon Store	Game of the Year	Won	
2024	The Steam Awards	VR Game of the Year	Nominated	
2025	AIXR XR Awards	XR Game of the Year	Nominated	
2025	2025 PICO Store Annual Awards		Won	
