= Horizon Worlds =

Virtual reality platform developed by Meta Platforms

Meta Horizon Worlds
- Artwork used since December 2021
- Developer: Meta Platforms, Inc.
- Publishers: Meta Platforms, Inc.
- Engine: Unity (2021‍–‍25); Horizon Engine (2025‍–‍pres.)
- Platforms: Meta Horizon OS; Microsoft Windows; iOS; Android
- Release: December 9, 2021 (U.S. and Canada)
- Genres: Game creation system, massively multiplayer online
- Mode: Multiplayer

Meta Horizon Worlds is an online multiplayer game, as well as game platform and game creation system, developed and published by Meta Platforms. Horizon Worlds was released in December 2021. Initially designed for virtual reality headsets as part of the QuestVR platform, a mobile version was released in September 2023, and in February 2026 Meta announced it would separate Worlds from QuestVR to primarily focus on the mobile version. In March, Meta announced that no new games would be added to the VR version.

In February 2022, Meta reported Horizon Worlds had an estimated 300,000 users; yet, by October 2022, The Wall Street Journal was reporting fewer than 200,000 monthly users. Horizon Worlds has received mixed reviews, with critics citing bugs and an unenjoyable environment that degrades the user experience.

== Gameplay ==
As of 2022, the game may be played with an Oculus Rift S, Meta Quest Pro, Meta Quest 3, Meta Quest 3S, or Meta Quest 2 virtual reality headset and uses full 3D motion via the motion capture system of the headset and two hand-held motion controllers, which are required to interact with objects in the game. In October 2022, Meta announced that they will be launching a web version, allowing users to access the game without a headset as well.

Users can create an avatar with a customized appearance. All players begin in a personal space which can optionally be customized and shared with others.

Part of Horizon Worlds is a world named Venues which is used for live events. Events streamed via the Venues platform have included UFC mixed martial arts competitions, live music events via the Tidal service, and NBA basketball games.

== Development ==
The development of Horizon Worlds (formerly called Facebook Horizon) followed earlier social VR apps by Facebook (Oculus Rooms, Oculus Venues, and Facebook Spaces) and focused more on user-generated content than these earlier apps. Facebook announced Facebook Horizon as a new social virtual world at the Oculus Connect 6 conference in September 2019. In August 2020, Facebook announced that more users will receive access to an invite-only beta phase. In an interview with Scott Stein in January 2021, Facebook Reality Labs head Andrew Bosworth conceded that the experiences in Facebook Horizon were not ready for the public and expressed concern that "[i]f you don't have… something driving a lot of people to the place, then you run the risk they're not going to get it."

In August 2021, Facebook released the open beta of Horizon Workrooms, a collaboration app targeted at teams managing remote-work environments. The app offers virtual meeting rooms, whiteboards and video call integration for up to 50 people. On 7 October 2021 Facebook changed the name Facebook Horizon to Horizon Worlds. After an invite-only beta phase, the game was released in the U.S. and Canada to people 18 years or older on December 9, 2021.

In March 2022, Meta announced Builder Tracks, a developer program for game development inside Horizon Worlds. Meta pledged $500,000 to fund the program, including cash prizes, a Horizon Worlds bootcamp, and support from Meta developers.

In April 2022, Meta started testing monetization in Horizon Worlds in the form of in-app purchases, where a few select creators began selling virtual items, such as power-ups, to players 18 years and older. Meta also started testing the Horizon Worlds Creator Bonus program where creators are paid monthly bonuses.

In July 2023, Meta's first-party studio Ouro Interactive released the shooter game Super Rumble, which utilized new creation features such as asset imports and TypeScript that were not previously available to developers.

In September 2023, Meta released web and mobile versions of the platform. These had originally been announced in February 2022 with a planned launch date later that year.

In October 2024, Meta rolled out changes to the appearance of in-game avatars. This change included a system to create custom clothes via AI in the Meta Horizon mobile app. They also added pre-teens as an age group, which makes creators able to mark their world as 10+. In October 2024, Meta introduced Meta Credits to allow users to more-easily spend money in Meta Horizon, similar to Robux in Roblox or Tokens in Rec Room. They can be purchased on mobile or in VR with USD.

In February 2025, Meta released a preview of the Horizon Worlds Desktop Editor, a Windows-based editor with the ability to import 3D assets, images, and sound files, place them in a 3D landscape, and implement game logic and other functionality using TypeScript, and announced that the in-headset editor would be deprecated. In September 2025, the company announced that the Desktop Editor would be renamed as Horizon Studio.

In February 2026, Meta separated Worlds from the VRQuest platform to almost exclusively focus on the mobile version. In March 2026, Meta announced that the VR version of Worlds would be discontinued by June. The company partially reversed this decision the next day, instead saying it planned to support existing games for the foreseeable future but no new games would be added to the platform.

== Regional release dates ==
- 9 December 2021 - United States and Canada
- 17 June 2022 - United Kingdom
- 13 July 2022 - Ireland, Iceland
- 16 August 2022 - France, Spain
- 25 June 2024 - Australia, Austria, Belgium, Denmark, Finland, Germany, Italy, Japan, Netherlands, New Zealand, Norway, Poland, South Korea, Sweden, Switzerland, Taiwan

== Reception ==
=== Critics ===
When Horizon Worlds was first announced in 2019 under the name Facebook Horizon, Josh Constine writing for TechCrunch compared it to other social virtual worlds such as Second Life, The Sims, AltspaceVR, Dreams, Roblox, and fictional "OASIS" described in the novel Ready Player One, while Sam Machkovech writing for Ars Technica emphasised similarities to Rec Room and VRChat. Machkovech noted a key difference to other social virtual worlds in Facebook's plan to let employees welcome new users. Scott Stein writing for CNET said that "[m]aybe Horizon is better than whatever Oculus had before"; however, he also observed that "there are a lot of social VR questions Horizon leaves unanswered".

David H. Freedman writing for Newsweek said that the use of VR would increase Facebook's knowledge about users' online behavior. Freedman speculated that Facebook could use this knowledge to generate advertising revenue with ads that permeate Facebook Horizon and "might appear as billboards, signage, skywriting, computer-generated characters hawking goods and services, logos embedded in objects and surfaces, and any other form that can be crammed into any nook or cranny of fake reality."

Kotaku described Horizon Worlds as "a strange experience" and that the overall vibe felt "less toxic than [they] expected, considering how awful Facebook is", and also called it a "hollow, corporate shell that has more in common with an office than it does a playground, or any other type of social space a human being would willingly want to hang out in." TheGamer also described Horizon Worlds as "less of a virtual utopia, and more of a glitchy, incomplete cluster of experiences" and criticized the current relative lack of safety features and poor management of misinformation and hate speech on the platform and described it as a "corporate reality that only investors and venture capitalists are seeking."

Vishal Shah, VP of Metaverse at Meta, commented that users and creators have provided feedback to the team about the lack of stability and prevalence of bugs in the platform. Shah also found that company employees have also stopped using the platform, writing, "The simple truth is, if we don't love it, how can we expect our users to love it?". Meta said that it was working towards improvements.

The game Super Rumble, developed by Meta for the platform in 2023, received generally positive reviews from critics.

=== Users ===
In February 2022 Meta stated that Horizon Worlds and Horizon Venues had a total monthly userbase of 300,000 people, that users had built 10,000 worlds within Horizon Worlds, and that its private Facebook group for creators had over 20,000 members.

In an October 2022 report, the Wall Street Journal stated that most users of Horizon Worlds only stay on the platform for a month, ending their interactions with it afterward. The report cites internal Meta documents and puts the monthly userbase at below 200,000 users. The same report found that most worlds created by players are never visited, and less than 9% have ever been visited by more than 50 people. That same month, The Soapstone Comedy Club, a user-created space for standup comedy, reported receiving up to 13,000 weekly visitors.

=== Controversies ===
On 26 November 2021, a beta user reported being groped on Horizon Worlds, and that other users supported the conduct. Meta responded that there is a tool called "Safe Zone" that users can initiate to protect themselves from interactions with others. A second reported incident occurred in December 2021 when a female user claimed she was virtually gangraped by about 3 to 4 male users after joining the platform. In another incident, a female reporter from the Wall Street Journal was asked to expose herself by another user while trying to conduct interviews in the game.

A February 2022 report by the Washington Post discussed concerns about children using Horizon Worlds despite the 18 or older age requirement, arguing it could lead to the platform being used by sexual predators for child grooming, while also noting the platform currently lacks parental controls and has been criticized for alleged lax moderation on preventing underaged users from using the platform.

In February 2022 Meta, in response to the incidents, added a "personal boundary" to Horizon Worlds and Venues which creates an invisible boundary that can prevent users from coming within four feet of other avatars. Plans were also announced for users to change the size of this boundary in the future. The boundary feature is similar to standard features in competing platforms VRChat and Rec Room though with options to disable and change the size of the boundary already existing. Horizon World's Safe Zone allows players to separate themselves from other players and their surroundings, as well as mute or block other players or certain types of content. In June 2022, Meta announced that it would roll out Voice Mode, a voice feature that allows users to garble incoming strangers' audio to protect themselves from potentially harmful or unwanted speech.

Meta announced in October 2022 that legs would be among the first new updates to the graphics, as characters previously lacked any; however, their initial reveal was criticized once it was discovered the models in the reveal were motion capture rather than being in-game footage.

=== Zuckerberg selfie ===
On August 16, 2022, CEO Mark Zuckerberg announced the release of Horizon Worlds in France and Spain on Facebook (also owned by Meta), with the message "We're launching Horizon Worlds in France and Spain today! Looking forward to seeing people explore and build immersive worlds, and to bringing this to more countries soon." Included with the post was an image depicting his avatar in front of interpretations of the Eiffel Tower (France) and Sagrada Família (Spain). The image quickly garnered mockery online, particularly on Twitter where it was criticized for its poor quality graphics in comparison to other video games; among these included comparisons with Linden Lab's Second Life, Sony Interactive Entertainment's Twisted Metal, Epic Games' Fortnite, and Nintendo's Mii, as well as generally finding the avatar dead-eyed or soulless.

On August 19, 2022, Zuckerberg responded to the memes on Instagram writing "the photo I posted earlier this week was pretty basic — it was taken very quickly to celebrate a launch", but reassured players that the graphics of Horizon Worlds were capable of "so much more"; included with the post was a more modern render of his avatar, as well as an ancient Rome environment. Commentators had mixed opinions on the new render with Polygon stating "doesn't exactly look like a place that's appealing to spend time in, but I suppose that's all in the eye of the beholder," while Kotaku felt it still "doesn't look nearly as good as what you can find in other VR offerings."
