= Slender: The Arrival =

2013 video game

- The original Steam storefront header
- Developers: Blue Isle Studios; Parsec Productions
- Publisher: Blue Isle Studios (Note: Midnight City published the game for the PlayStation 3 and Xbox 360, as well as initially on Steam.)
- Director: Alex Tintor
- Producer: Eric Knudsen
- Writers: Joseph DeLage; Tim Sutton; Troy Wagner
- Composers: Mark J. Hadley; Brenden Frank
- Engine: Unity (original); Unreal Engine 5 (remaster)
- Platforms: OS X; Windows; PlayStation 3; Xbox 360; PlayStation 4; Xbox One; Wii U; Nintendo Switch; Android; iOS; Remaster; macOS; Windows; PlayStation 5; Xbox Series X/S
- Release: March 26, 2013: OS X, Windows; WW: March 26, 2013; PlayStation 3; NA: September 23, 2014; EU: September 24, 2014; Xbox 360; WW: September 24, 2014; PlayStation 4; NA: March 24, 2015; EU: March 25, 2015; Xbox One; WW: March 25, 2015; Wii U; NA: October 22, 2015; EU: October 29, 2015; Nintendo Switch; NA: June 20, 2019; EU: June 20, 2019; Android, iOS; WW: October 13, 2021; Remaster; WW: October 18, 2023
- Genre: Survival horror
- Mode: Single-player

Slender: The Arrival is a 2013 survival horror game developed by Blue Isle Studios and Parsec Productions. It is based on the Slender Man, a creepypasta character created by Eric Knudsen, and is a sequel to Parsec Productions's Slender: The Eight Pages (2012). The game revolves around a young woman who ventures into the woods to investigate the disappearance of her childhood best friend. Equipped only with a flashlight, the player explores abandoned locations and completes objectives while avoiding the Slender Man and his proxies.

Alex Tintor and Brenden Frank of Blue Isle Studios and Mark J. Hadley of Parsec Productions worked with Knudsen as the producer and the creators of the Marble Hornets web series—Joseph DeLage, Tim Sutton, and Troy Wagner—as the writers. The Arrival was announced in September 2012 and released for OS X and Windows in March 2013, followed by ports to various video game consoles, Android, and iOS.

Slender: The Arrival received mixed reviews from video game journalists, who praised its soundtrack, atmosphere, and jump scares, but criticized its short length and repetitive gameplay. A tenth-anniversary remaster was released for macOS and Windows, the PlayStation 5, and the Xbox Series X/S in October 2023. A virtual reality version and a sequel, S: Lost Chapters, are in development.

== Gameplay ==
The player wanders around a mine, attempting to power an emergency lift, while the Chaser attacks the player.

Slender: The Arrival is a survival horror game played from a first-person perspective. It takes place in abandoned areas and structures such as forests, buildings, mountains, and a mining facility, each with different objectives. Like in its predecessor, Slender: The Eight Pages, the player is equipped only with a flashlight. Sprinting depletes the player character's stamina, after which it takes time to regenerate, forcing the player to conserve their energy.

Enemies include the Slender Man, who can teleport from place to place with the only option for the player to run away. The player is also chased by the Chaser, who is controlled by the Slender Man. The only way to subdue the Chaser is by focusing the flashlight on its face. The game features the Easy, Normal, and Hardcore difficulties. In Hardcore, which is unlocked after completing the game, the flashlight's battery can deplete and enemies behave more aggressively.

In a secret level obtained by collecting a missing child poster in three game sessions, the player plays hide-and-seek with the Slender Man. The hidden "Genesis" level, unlocked after finishing the campaign, remakes The Eight Pages.

== Plot ==
As Lauren arrives in Oakside Park to help her childhood best friend Kate move out of her childhood home, she finds Kate missing, her belongings disheveled, and her bedroom littered with drawings of and messages about a tall, faceless entity known as the Slender Man. As Lauren hears screaming outside, she heads into the dark woods to look for Kate. Looking for clues, she collects eight pages with scribbled drawings before being pursued by the Slender Man, eventually passing out. As Lauren ventures deeper into the woods, she is attacked by the Slender Man, slips down an embankment and passes out. Lauren regains consciousness in the morning and continues her search, leading her into an abandoned coal mine. Evading the Slender Man and one of his proxies known as the Chaser, she powers an emergency lift and uses it to exit the mine onto a mountainside.

Lauren heads towards a nearby radio tower and in a storage outpost finds two tapes. One shows Kate scribbling in her bedroom as she notices the Slender Man trying to enter her house, leaving her to try to flee through her window. The tape abruptly ends as the Slender Man appears behind her. The other tape retells Carl "CR" Ross investigating a farm where he collects evidence about Charles Matheson, whose son Charlie had been abducted by the Slender Man. At a chapel, he discovers that the Matheson family had been haunted by the Slender Man for generations. CR is then attacked by a disfigured Charlie, who chases him off the chapel grounds, ending the tape.

After watching the tapes, Lauren continues towards the radio tower and finds herself in a forest fire in pursuit by the Slender Man. Inside the radio tower building, she discovers CR's burnt corpse in a dead end alongside a camera with a recording of Kate and CR's panicked screams. Suddenly, the corridor goes dark and Lauren is attacked by Charlie, knocking her unconscious. She reawakens in a farmhouse basement, with Charlie temporarily blocks the exit. Lauren hears Kate crying and heads upstairs, where she is attacked by the Chaser, who is revealed to be Kate. Lauren is briefly seen being dragged away before the battery of her camera runs out.

The "Genesis" chapter acts as a remake of The Eight Pages, with the protagonist revealed to be Kate. After fleeing from the Slender Man, Kate sees herself in a forest and collects eight pages with scribbled drawings before being caught by the Slender Man, who says that he has "plans for her".

The "Nightmare" chapter added in the 2023 remaster takes place before Lauren watches the tapes in the storage outpost. She additionally finds a box of files that detail Charles discovering a proxied Charlie before being attacked by the Slender Man. He wakes up in a derelict hospital which he explores while facing many of the Slender Man's hallucinations. Outside the hospital, he finds Charlie crying and approaches him, but Charlie returns to his disfigured form and attacks his father. Charles finds himself back in the hospital, which he sets ablaze, convinced by messages on the walls telling him that he can save Charlie by cleansing himself with fire.

== Development and release ==
Slender Man is a fictional supernatural character based on a creepypasta by Eric Knudsen. After its 2009 inception, the character and its related lore spread on the Internet, eliciting several fan creations. Among them, Marble Hornets, a YouTube channel known for its horror videos, helped shape the modern version of the Slender Man character. Parsec Productions, the one-man studio of Mark J. Hadley, developed Slender: The Eight Pages, and released it as freeware in August 2012.

The creators of Marble Hornets (left to right)—Joseph DeLage, Troy Wagner, and Tim Sutton—wrote the script for Slender: The Arrival.

Hadley followed it up with Slender: The Arrival in cooperation with Blue Isle Studios, the studio founded by the creative director Alex Tintor and Brendan Frank. They used the Unity game engine. The cooperation was announced in September 2012, shortly after the release of The Eight Pages. The announcement foretold "more levels, improved visuals, and an engaging storyline" as improvements over The Eight Pages. Teaser screenshots showcased the graphical upgrades. In December 2012, Blue Isle Studios announced its partnership with the creators of Marble Hornets—Joseph DeLage, Tim Sutton, and Troy Wagner—who helped write the script. Knudsen served as a producer.

Slender: The Arrival was opened to the public for beta testing in February 2013. Those who pre-ordered it were entitled to a free demo. Highly anticipated by fans, Slender: The Arrival was released on personal computers on March 26, 2013, through their official website. When Majesco established its indie game label Midnight City in August, it was henceforth publishing Slender: The Arrival. The company released the game to Steam in October 2013, which included support for the Oculus Rift virtual reality headset. In 2014, Midnight City announced the game's impending release for the PlayStation 3 via PlayStation Network and for the Xbox 360 via Xbox Live Arcade. It released the PlayStation 3 version in North America on September 23, 2014, and in Europe on September 24, 2014, the same day as the Xbox 360 version. The PlayStation 4 version was released on March 24, 2015, in North America and the Xbox One and European PlayStation 4 versions on March 25, 2015. The Wii U version came out on October 22, 2015, in North America and in Europe on October 29. The game came to the Nintendo Switch via the Nintendo eShop on June 20, 2019. On October 13, 2021, Blue Isle Studios released Slender: The Arrival for Android and iOS devices, offering the first chapter for free. The mobile version added leaderboards and challenges.

On July 27, 2023, to celebrate the game's 10th anniversary, Blue Isle Studios announced a remaster made in Unreal Engine 5. The studio released it on October 18, 2023, for macOS, Windows, the PlayStation 5, and the Xbox Series X/S. It features a redesigned Slender Man, a new story chapter, and overhauled graphics, including support for the Deep Learning Super Sampling technology. Alongside the remaster, Blue Isle Studios also announced a sequel, S: Lost Chapters. In March 2025, the studio revealed virtual reality versions for the Meta Quest 2, Meta Quest 3, Meta Quest 3S, Meta Quest Pro, and PlayStation VR2 headsets. Published by Perp Games, they were scheduled to be released on May 13, 2025, but delayed.

== Reception ==
Reception

Aggregate score
Aggregator	Score
Metacritic	PC: 65/100; PS3: 48/100; X360: 61/100; PS4: 60/100; XONE: 59/100; NS: 55/100

Review scores
Publication	Score
Eurogamer	8/10
GameSpot	8.5/10
GamesRadar+	3/5
IGN	6.5/10
Nintendo Life	4/10
PC Gamer (US)	65/100
VideoGamer.com	4/10
Digital Spy	3/5
The Escapist	4.5/5

Slender: The Arrival received mixed reviews, according to the review aggregator website Metacritic. Critics praised the game's soundtrack, atmosphere, and scares, while criticizing its short campaign length and repetitive gameplay. The Arrival has been described as a bigger-budget version of The Eight Pages. Dan Whitehead of Eurogamer called it more polished and structured than the original game. Edwin Evans-Thirwell of GamesRadar+ felt it was largely the same game as The Eight Pages with negligible improvements spread across multiple levels.

Slender: The Arrival's gameplay divided critics. Marty Sliva of IGN called the objectives repetitive and the enemies unfair. Andy Kelly of PC Gamer described the gameplay as challenging but criticized the levels as repetitive and poorly paced, which he found frustrating. Ben Lee of Digital Spy said that the game mechanics made for "quite a dull game". Andi Hamilton of VideoGamer.com described the gameplay as minimal, repetitive, and dull, also feeling that the enemy artificial intelligence was unfair.

Critics were positive about the story. Whitehead said that, for a horror game, it offered a different cinematic experience. Daniel Starkey of GameSpot praised the "presentation of narrative". When comparing it to The Eight Pages, Paul Goodman of The Escapist found it to have "a much more robust story". Sliva and Simon Parkin of Eurogamer criticized its campaign length, whey they had expected to be longer.

The graphics and soundtrack received praise. Kelly found the graphics beautiful and said they provided a welcome break in the daylight scenes from the otherwise dark game and showed the "surprisingly beautiful world design". Starkey put the graphics into perspective, calling the visuals cutting-edge, while criticizing the game's constant use of "peculiarly pervasive darkness". Hamilton likened the graphics to those of Dear Esther and said they helped to elevate the atmosphere. According to Sliva, the soundtrack "really adds to the already creepy atmosphere". Lee similarly found that the experience was helped by the sound design and soundtrack.

The PlayStation 3 and Nintendo Switch versions of Slender: The Arrival were received poorly. Graham Banas of Push Square criticized the PlayStation 3 port for its awkward textures, low-resolution graphics, washed-out flashlight effect, and uncomfortable controls. He called the audio the "saving grace in this shudder-inducing outing". Lewis White of Nintendo Life criticized the Nintendo Switch port for its "drastic" visual downgrades. The PlayStation 3 and Xbox 360 versions of Slender: The Arrival sold over 100,000 copies within one month.
