= Meta Quest Browser =

Web browser for Meta Quest devices

- Developer(s): Meta Platforms
- Stable release: 33.0 / May 2, 2024
- Engine: Blink, V8
- Operating system: Meta Horizon OS
- Type: Web browser
- License: Freeware
- Website: Meta Horizon Store

Meta Quest Browser, known until 2024 as Oculus Browser, is a web browser developed by Meta Platforms for use on the Oculus Quest and its successor devices (Quest 2, Quest Pro, Quest 3), all of which use the Android operating system. It is based on Chromium, which uses Blink, a derivative of WebKit.

The browser was first developed by the Oculus division of Facebook, Inc., in a series of developer previews under the codename "Carmel", which was first released on December 9, 2016.

== Version history ==
All versions are sourced from the Meta website.

Version	Date	New features	Ref.
5.0	May 7, 2019	Updates from Chromium 62, 63, 64, 65, and 66	
5.2		Fixed issues with scrolling, layout of media controls, persistent dimming, notification bar input issues.; improved Desktop mode button tooltip text; Localized switching to Desktop Mode tooltip for more languages	
5.4		Permissions Dialog management feature; WebXR support (experimental)	
5.7		bug fixes	
5.8		New Tab Page redesign; ability to save 360 Videos, 360 Photos, 3D Photos, 360 Experiences in Facebook mobile app and open them in Oculus Browser; improved playback experience with better battery life	
5.9		drop down menus for selecting 180, 360, and 3D video formats when watching fullscreen video	
6.0	July 16, 2019	Update to Chromium version 74; bug fixes	
6.1	September 16, 2019	About Oculus Browser dialog in Settings for version numbers, privacy policy, and terms of service information	
6.2	October 25, 2019	60 FPS display support for full-screen video; pointer type changed from a stylus to a finger; page zoom level control; option to opt-out of browser telemetry	
7.0	December 6, 2019	Updated to Chromium version 77; Support for WebXR on by default; improvements to reliability, site compatibility, performance, security and WebXR/VR support	
7.1	December 17, 2019	WebXR Gamepad module support for Quest, Go, GearVR	
8.0	February 4, 2020	Update to Chromium version 79; initial hand-tracking support for WebXR projects	
8.1	February 18, 2020		
8.2	March 3, 2020		
8.3	March 17, 2020	new browser interface and experience; Browser loads desktop sites by default; ability to switch to mobile	
8.4	March 31, 2020		
8.5	April 15, 2020		
9.0	April 25, 2020	Updated to Chromium version 81; Removed WebVR support	
10.0	June 22, 2020	Updated to Chromium version 83	
10.2		hand-tracking API (experimental); timewarp layer support (experimental)	
11.0	August 4, 2020	Updated to Chromium version 84	
12.0	October 26, 2020	Updated to Chromium version 86	
13.0	November 30, 2020	Updated to Chromium version 87	
14.0	January 29, 2021	Updated to Chromium version 88	
15.0	March 30, 2021	Updated to Chromium version 89; Copy/Paste now supported throughout; Context menu with support for Cut/Copy/Paste, Open In New Tab, etc.	
15.1		WebXR Hand Tracking API enabled by default	
16.0	June 7, 2021	Updated to Chromium version 91	
16.1		WebXR Layers and Media Layers enabled by default	
16.2		bug fixes	
31.2	January 16, 2024	renamed as Meta Quest Browser; experimental changes to New Tab and Fullscreen view; bug fixes	
31.3	February 17, 2024	opening New Window through options menu or right-clicking a link (experimental); persistent audio while in another tab (experimental); improvements to New Tab and Fullscreen view (experimental)	
31.4	February 21, 2024	available on OS v62+ only; simultaneous hands and controllers enabled in WebXR; browser tabs now available in immersive applications	
32.0	March 3, 2024	WebXR gamepad updates; Experimental WebXR support for body tracking; Support for WebGPU; support for selected Browser Extensions (experimental); Updated to Chromium Milestone 122	
32.1	March 19, 2024	opening New Window through options menu or right-clicking a link (standard)	
32.2	April 14, 2024	Browser Extensions (standard)	
32.3	April 17, 2024	Profile Guided Optimization (PGO) implemented; PDF reader (experimental)	
33.0	May 2, 2024	draggable tabs; fix to WebXR timing issue when using hands-as-controllers and re-enabled the feature; update to Chromium Milestone 124; updates to Full Screen mode, Extensions, and the New Tab Page; WebXR fix: wrong controller type was showing up for Quest Pro	
33.1	May 11, 2024	PDF reader extension no longer experimental; Full screen controls allow for multiple screen size options and controlling brightness of environment while watching full screen video; increased speed on omnibar auto-complete suggestions; Bug fixes for audio playback while browser is background; WebXR joint names adjusted to match W3C specification	
33.2	May 25, 2024	support for dragging tabs with direct touch using a pinching gesture; select from multiple screen size options and control the brightness of the immersive environment while watching full screen videos	
33.3	June 5, 2024	Browser now supports sending push notifications. To enable them, sites must request permissions to send notifications (experimental); Depth sensing implementation updated to support latest WebXR specification.	
34.0	June 26, 2024	browser UI performance updated; performance updated via compiler optimizations	
34.1	July 9, 2024	WebXR Multimodal Input for hands and controllers; Background Fetch API enabled for use by websites to download content to be used while offline	
34.2	July 17, 2024	experimental support for unbounded spaces for creating large scale AR experiences that are no longer limited to the guardian boundary	
34.3	July 31, 2024	WebXR: transform now provided for the origin reset event	
34.4	August 15, 2024	tab bar now hidden if only one tab in panel (optional); Speculation Rules API now works in Browser; Preloading able to be disabled in settings	
34.5	September 5, 2024	bug, security and reliability fixes	
35.0	September 12, 2024	redesigned user experience when dragging and dropping tabs (experimental); Updated to Chromium Milestone 128; bug, security and reliability fixes	
35.1	September 30, 2024	support for Dolby Atmos in supported websites; all websites now play stereo audio from perspective of Browser; WebXR support for new 6DoF pen controller (Logitech MX Ink) with 2 buttons and 2 pressure sensitive areas; bug, security and reliability fixes	
35.3	October 31, 2024	bug, security and reliability fixes	
36.0	November 7, 2024	WebXR: foveation will now apply smoothly instead of limited to 3 levels; WebXR: support for viewport scaling	
36.2	December 16, 2024	Depth' and 'Planes' permissions in WebXR combined into single 'Spatial' permission; PDF Reader extension automatically installed for users; ability to import passwords from other browsers; Ability to manage site permissions across all sites; Ability to share your screen with others during a video call (experimental); Improvements in the video rendering; improvements and fixes	
