= Cybershoes =

VR control device

Cybershoes was a virtual reality (VR) locomotion peripheral produced by the Vienna-based company Cybershoes GmbH. The device was worn over conventional footwear and used while seated on a swivel chair. Rollers beneath the shoes registered the user's movements and translated them into locomotion in virtual reality.

Cybershoes GmbH was founded in Vienna in 2018. The company developed versions for PC-based VR systems and later for the Meta Quest platform. Production was discontinued around 2023, and the company ceased operations in 2025.

== Design and functionality ==
The Cybershoes were strapped to the user's shoes and had a roller beneath each foot. The user remained seated and moved the feet back and forth over a carpet surface. The rotation of the rollers provided the walking input, while an inertial sensor registered the orientation of the feet to determine the direction of movement in VR. The first version targeted PC VR systems. A later version communicated wirelessly with Meta Quest headsets.

== History ==
By 2016, Michael Bieglmayer was developing Cybershoes, which were publicly demonstrated at AWE Europe in 2017. Cybershoes GmbH was founded in Vienna in 2018 by Bieglmayer and five other co-founders, including Igor Mitric Lavovski. Its first Kickstarter campaign in 2018 raised more than €200,000 for a PC VR version of the device. During its development and launch, Cybershoes was demonstrated at technology and gaming events including E3, gamescom, the Tokyo Game Show and CES. A wireless version for Oculus Quest was released in 2021.

Production of new Cybershoes ended around 2023, and Cybershoes GmbH ceased operations in 2025.

== Reception ==
In a 2018 hands-on review, UploadVR found the physical method of controlling movement more engaging than thumbstick-based locomotion, but noted limitations caused by the seated position. The reviewer said that actions such as moving sideways or quickly turning were more difficult, and described the cable arrangement used with the PC version as inconvenient.

A 2018 Road to VR hands-on report similarly found forward and backward movement straightforward but noted that turning while seated could be cumbersome and that the wired version required a means of keeping the headset cable away from the user.

Coverage of the Quest version focused particularly on software support. In 2021, TechRadar reported that thirteen Quest games supported the accessory at the time and argued that the comparatively small number of compatible titles, together with the accessory's price, could limit its adoption.
