= Walkabout Mini Golf =

2020 virtual reality video game

- Cover art
- Developer: Mighty Coconut
- Platforms: Meta Quest; Windows; PlayStation VR2
- Release: 24 September 2020: Meta Quest; WW: 24 September 2020; Microsoft Windows; WW: 15 July 2021; PlayStation VR2; WW: 11 May 2023
- Genre: Sports
- Modes: Single-player, Multiplayer

Walkabout Mini Golf is a virtual reality sports video game developed and published by Mighty Coconut. The game simulates miniature golf, with players completing 18-hole golf courses. Upon release, the game received positive reviews.

== Gameplay ==
Players use virtual reality to complete 18-hole golf courses. The game contains eight courses, with additional themed courses obtainable as downloadable content, themed around licensed properties such as Labyrinth or Myst Courses have a harder difficulty version set at night, which unlocks new clubs upon completion. Each course contains hidden 'collecti-balls' which players can locate to unlock custom clubs. The game also contains a driving range and putting green to allow players to practice.

== Development ==
Walkabout Mini Golf was developed by Austin, Texas-based Mighty Coconut, a studio led by lead designer Lucas Martell. Martell, who was originally from a film and animation development background, stated development on the game was originally intended as an iOS and Android title. Courses were designed using the Meta Quest Gravity Sketch development suite. Senior art director Don Carson, formerly a Walt Disney Imagineering employee, stated that the creative direction of the game took a similar approach to a theme park in creating themed environments, using sketched concept art and mood boards to set the direction of the level. The game was released for the PSVR2 on 11 May 2023.

== Reception ==
Reception

Aggregate score
Aggregator	Score
Metacritic	90/100

Review score
Publication	Score
Push Square	8/10

Walkabout Mini Golf received "universal acclaim" based on four reviews, according to review aggregator Metacritic. In 2025, Meta identified the game as the twentieth best-selling title for the Meta Quest platform.
