= Meta Horizon Store =

Online storefront

- Developer: Meta Platforms
- Launched: 2013
- Website: www.meta.com/experiences

The Meta Horizon Store, known from 2013 to 2015 as Oculus Share, 2015 to 2022 as Oculus Store and from 2022 to 2024 as the Meta Quest Store, is the main video game and app store digital distribution service and storefront developed by Meta Platforms for the Meta Quest and its successors, as well as for Meta Horizon OS-based devices.

== History ==
The beta version of the Oculus Share website was first announced on August 19, 2013, to allow users to self-publish, discover, download, and play games and experiences. In 2015, following Oculus VR's acquisition by Facebook, Oculus Share was shut down and revamped as the Oculus Store for the consumer-facing Oculus Rift, including pre-approvals, sales taxes and comfort ratings. In addition, the company announced an investment of $10 million into indie game developers to distribute their games in the store.

In 2021, Facebook introduced "App Lab", a new section within the storefront allowing developers to upload and distribute apps without going through the formal review process. App Lab is designed primarily to support early access models, and can support public and invite-based distribution.

As a result of Facebook's corporate rebranding as Meta Platforms, CTO Andrew Bosworth announced that the Oculus brand would be phased out in 2022; all Facebook hardware products will be marketed under the Meta name, and Oculus Store would be renamed Quest Store. Likewise, immersive social platforms associated with Oculus will be brought under the Horizon brand (such as Horizon Worlds).

On April 22, 2024, the company announced that the Meta Quest Store was renamed as the Meta Horizon Store. In the same announcement, software platform would be rebranded as Meta Horizon OS and opened to third-party headset manufacturers (starting with Microsoft, Asus and Lenovo), the Meta Quest mobile companion app renamed as the Horizon mobile app, and a new spatial app framework was announced to assist mobile developers in porting their software to, or programming original apps for, Horizon OS. In addition, the company announced that App Lab would be phased out in two phases, first placing App Lab access inside of a tab in the Horizon Store instead of a separate URL, and later phasing out all references to App Lab and merging App Lab content into the Horizon Store while no longer rejecting submissions to the Store on the basis of taste or quality.

=== Controversies ===
In 2022, the Federal Trade Commission and the attorneys general of New York, Tennessee, and North Carolina began investigations into Meta's VR-related business practices, including third-party app distribution on the Oculus Store, over allegations of anti-competitive behaviors.
