= Detachment 201 =

US army reserve group

Detachment 201, also known as the Executive Innovation Corps, is a United States Army Reserve group formed of U.S. technology executives directly commissioned to the rank of Lieutenant colonel.

The Army's stated purpose of the initiative is to "fuse cutting-edge tech expertise with military innovation" by recruiting senior tech executives to serve part-time in the Army Reserve as senior advisors. A statement by the United States Army made on social media said the group "will work on targeted projects to help guide rapid and scalable tech solutions to complex problems" in order to "make the force leaner, smarter, and more lethal."

The initial group of executives, sworn in June 13, 2025, includes Facebook parent company Meta Platforms CTO Andrew Bosworth, current and former OpenAI executives Kevin Weil and Bob McGrew, and Palantir Technologies CTO Shyam Sankar.

In June 2026, the second cohort of executives was sworn in, comprising Dane Knecht, CTO of Cloudflare, Sam Pullara, Managing Director and CTO of Sutter Hill Ventures, and Serkan Piantino, co-founder of Facebook AI Research.
