= S – Lost Chapters =

Upcoming video game

S: Lost Chapters
- Developer: Blue Isle Studios
- Publisher: Blue Isle Publishing
- Platform: Windows
- Release: 2026
- Genre: Survival horror
- Mode: Single-player

S: Lost Chapters is an upcoming survival horror game developed and published by Blue Isle Studios, scheduled for release on Windows. Following Slender: The Arrival (2013), it will be the third entry in the Slender series of video games that started with The Eight Pages (2012).

== Plot ==
As a sequel to Slender: The Arrival, S: Lost Chapters will build on and expand the lore around the creepypasta character Slender Man. The game will narratively mix both old and new stories, taking place at familiar and unknown locations and introducing new characters. Blue Isle Studios described the plot as a "narrative where the events of the past merge with the mysteries of the present, creating a web of interconnected stories". S: Lost Chapters is expected to use the cut portion of the Slender: The Arrival storyline that was written by Troy Wagner, Joseph DeLage, and Tim Sutton, which reportedly was downsized to 20% of its original plot.

== Gameplay ==
Similar to its predecessors, S: Lost Chapters is a survival horror game played from a first-person perspective. It will feature new enemies, both new and old settings, and new game mechanics. Compared to The Eight Pages (2012) and The Arrival (2013), whose gameplay was simple and consisted primarily of walking, hiding, dodging, and escaping, Lost Chapters will feature more complex, survival-centered mechanics requiring strategic thinking and decision-making.

== Development and release ==
In a 2014 interview with the horror game news and review website Rely On Horror about the studio's future plans, Blue Isle Studios stated that "there's still enormous potential for all kinds of stories to be told in this [the Slender Man's] universe", and that "[d]oing a sequel or even a trilogy has definitely crossed our minds at some point".

Following the release of a 14-second teaser trailer on June 22, 2023, and a countdown on its official website, S: Lost Chapters was announced by Blue Isle Studios on July 27, 2023, alongside the tenth-anniversary remake of Slender: The Arrival. Said announcement included screenshots of the game, but no formal trailer was released. In an October 2023 interview with Game Rant, Brenden Frank, the co-founder and technical director of Blue Isle Studios, said: "The game is under tight wraps, and until we’re ready to make bigger announcements, we intend to keep it that way". Originally planned for a release sometime in 2024, the game was delayed. It will be available on Windows via Steam.
