= Quest 2 =

Virtual reality headset

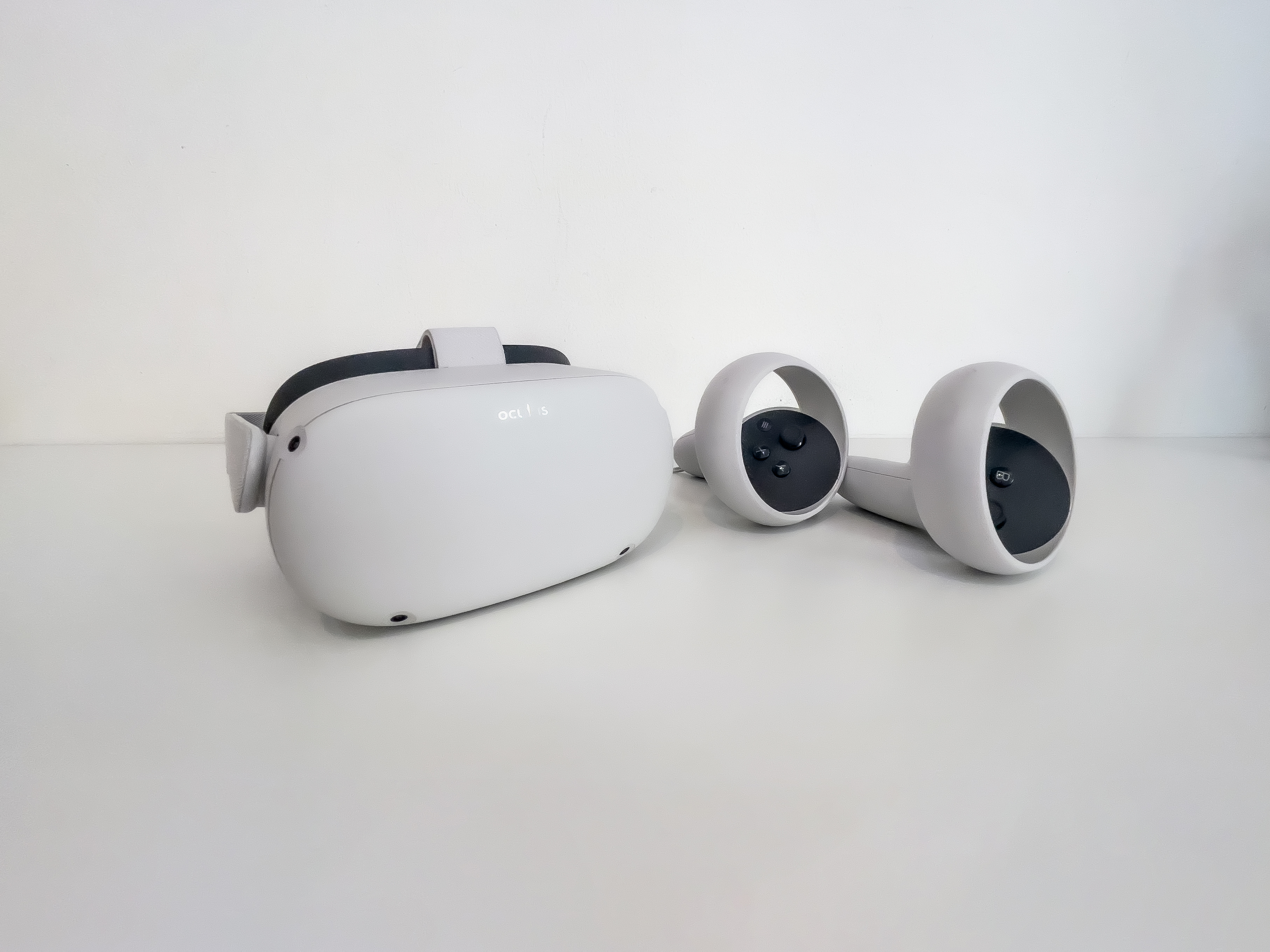
- Meta Quest 2 set and its controllers
- Codename: "Miramar" "Hollywood" "Del Mar"
- Also known as: Oculus Quest 2, Meta Quest 2, Quest 2
- Developer: Reality Labs
- Manufacturer: Meta
- Type: Virtual reality headset
- Generation: Second
- Released: October 13, 2020
- Lifespan: 2020–2027
- Introductory price: US$299 (64 GB); US$299 (128 GB); US$399 (256 GB)
- Discontinued: September 25, 2024
- Units sold: 15 to 20 Milion Units Sold
- Units shipped: 15 to 18 Units shipped
- Operating system: Meta Horizon OS, based on Android source code. Original: Android 10 (v21 – v50) Current: Android 14 (v2.9.0) Meta Horizon OS 2)
- System on a chip: Qualcomm Snapdragon XR2
- Memory: 6 GB LPDDR4X
- Storage: 64 GB(Discontinued), 128 GB, 256 GB
- Display: RGB LCD 1832 x 1920 per eye @ 72 - 120 Hz
- Graphics: Adreno 650 @ 587 MHz (Up to 902 GFLOPS FP32)
- Sound: 2 built in speakers / 2 built in microphones / 3.5mm headphone jack
- Input: 6DOF inside-out tracking through 4 built-in cameras and 2 controllers with accelerometers and gyroscopes
- Controller input: Oculus Touch
- Camera: 4 infrared cameras
- Connectivity: USB-C; Bluetooth 5; Wi-Fi 6
- Online services: Quest Store
- Weight: 503 g (17.7 oz)
- Predecessor: Oculus Quest
- Successor: Meta Quest 3 Meta Quest 3S
- Related: oculus quest meta quest 3S Meta Quest Pro Meta Quest 3
- Website: Official website

The Quest 2 is a discontinued standalone virtual reality headset developed by Reality Labs, a division of Facebook, Inc. (now Meta Platforms). It was unveiled on September 16, 2020, and released on October 13, 2020 as the Oculus Quest 2, as the second generation of the Quest line. It was then rebranded as the Meta Quest 2 in 2022, as part of a company-wide phase-out of the Oculus brand following the rebranding of Facebook, Inc. as Meta.

The Quest 2 is an updated version of the original Oculus Quest with a lighter weight, updated internal specifications, a display with a higher per-eye resolution and refresh rate, and updated Oculus Touch controllers with improved battery life. As with its predecessor, the Quest 2 can run as either a standalone headset with an internal, Android-based operating system, or with Oculus Rift-compatible VR software running on a personal computer.

The Quest 2 received mostly positive reviews as an incremental update to the Quest, with critics noting its improved display and weight. Some of its changes faced criticism, including its stock head strap, reduced interpupillary distance (IPD) options, and a new requirement for users to log in with a Facebook account to use the headset and Oculus services. The Quest 2 was succeeded by the Meta Quest 3 in 2023, but remained in production until it was replaced at the same price point by the Quest 3S in September 2024.

== Specifications ==
=== Design ===
Its design is similar to that of the original Quest, but replaces the black, cloth-covered exterior with white-colored plastic. It is lighter than the first-generation Quest, at 503 grams (17.7 oz) in comparison to 571 grams (20.1 oz). The strap was changed to one made of fabric, held with adjustable velcro, from the elastic strap of the first-generation Quest.

=== Hardware ===
The Quest 2 uses the Snapdragon XR2, a system on a chip by Qualcomm. It is a derivative of the Snapdragon 865 that is designed for VR and augmented reality devices. It includes 6 GB of LPDDR4X RAM — an increase of 2 GB over the first-generation model.

The dual OLED displays of the first-generation Quest were replaced by a singular, fast-switch LCD panel with a per-eye resolution of 1832×1920, and a refresh rate of up to 120 Hz (an increase from 1440×1600 per-eye at 72 Hz). The display uses striped subpixels rather than a PenTile matrix; this arrangement improves image clarity by reducing the screen-door effect. At launch, the display's refresh rate was locked at 72 Hz via software, with 90 Hz mode as an experimental option limited to the home area only. A software update in November 2020 enabled games to run in 90 Hz mode. In April 2021, an update further added experimental support for 120 Hz mode in games.

The headset supports physical interpupillary distance (IPD) adjustment at 58 mm, 63 mm and 68 mm, adjusted by physically moving the lenses into each position.

=== Software ===
The Quest 2 runs operating system software based on Android Open Source Project (AOSP) source code (branded since April 2024 as "Horizon OS"). To conduct first-time setup, a smartphone running the Meta Quest app must be used.

An update in February 2021 added support for up to three additional accounts to be logged into a single headset, with the ability for accounts to share purchased software between them. In April 2021, a software update added "Air Link" as an experimental feature, which allows games to be streamed from a PC over Wi-Fi. In July 2021, experimental APIs were added to the Passthrough feature to allow for augmented reality features.

The internal operating system was originally based on Android 10 source code. In March 2023, Meta announced that all new Quest apps would be required to target API level 32 (Android 12L) by June 30.

=== Controllers ===
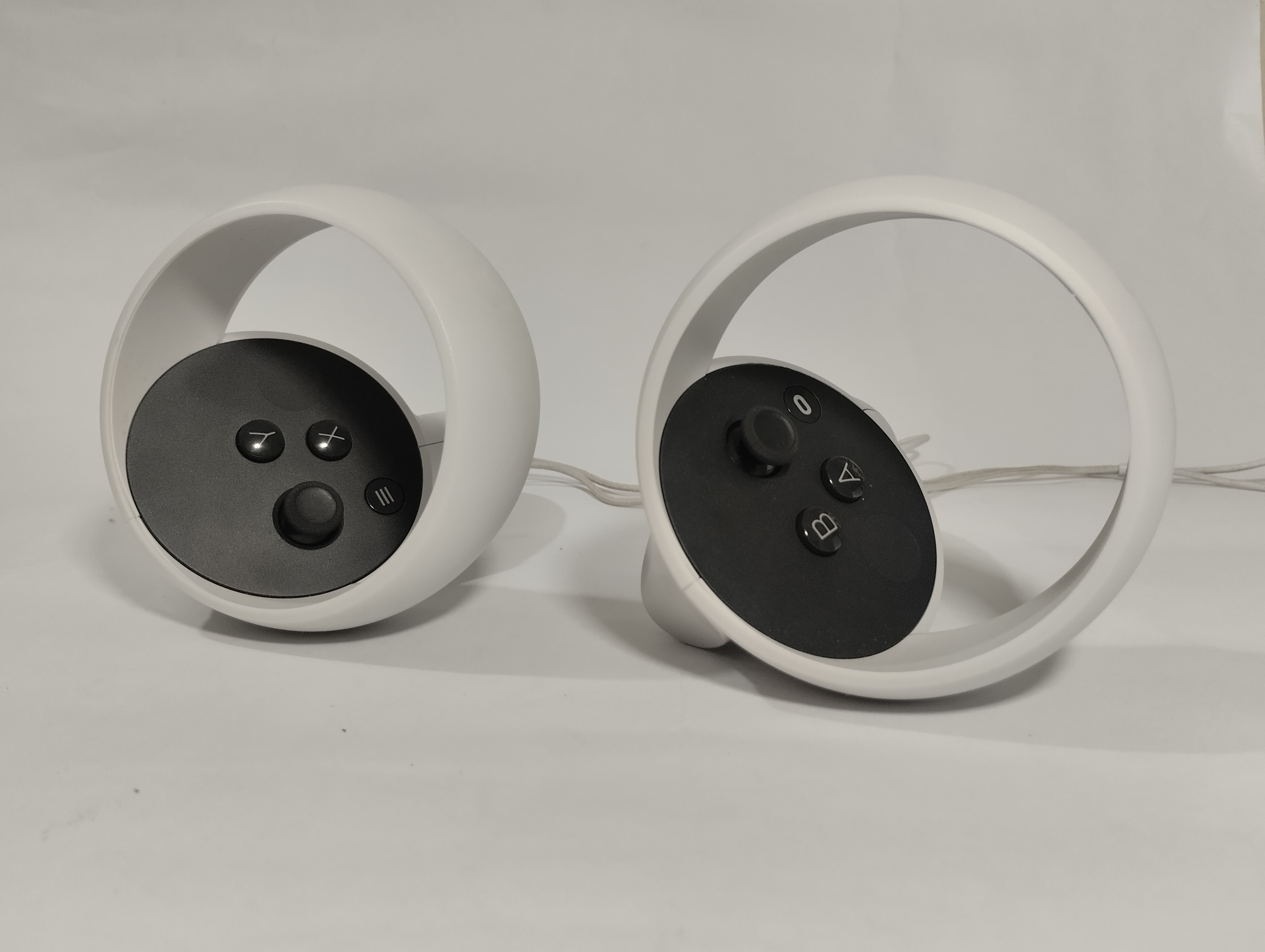
The Quest 2's Oculus Touch controllers

The included controllers with the Quest 2 are the third-generation Oculus Touch controllers. The design of the new controllers was influenced by the original Oculus Rift controllers. Their battery life has also been increased four-fold over the controllers included with the first-generation Quest.

== Games ==
Quest 2 supports all games and software made for the first-generation model, and existing titles can be updated to support higher graphical quality on Quest 2. It also supports Quest Link (USB) and Air Link (Wi-Fi), which allows the headset to be used with Oculus Rift-compatible software on a PC. It is not backwards compatible with Oculus Go apps and games.

== Release ==
The Quest 2 was first released in two SKUs differentiated by storage capacity, with a 64 GB model priced at US$299, and a 256 GB model (replacing the original Quest's 128 GB model) priced at $399; both were $100 cheaper than their equivalent SKUs for the first-generation Quest. In 2021, the 64 GB model of the Quest 2 was replaced by a 128 GB model at the same price point.

In November 2021, as part of the rebranding of Facebook, Inc. as Meta, the Oculus brand began to be phased out; the Oculus Quest 2 began to be referred to "Meta Quest 2" in promotional materials, Oculus Store was rebranded as "Quest Store", and Oculus-developed community platforms (such as Facebook Horizon) took on the "Horizon" brand. In March 2022, system software version 38 replaced all instances of the Oculus logo with that of Meta, and by April 2022, newer production runs of the Quest 2 hardware had the Oculus branding replaced by Meta.

Meta aired a commercial for the Quest 2 and Horizon Worlds, "Old Friends, New Fun", during Super Bowl LVI in February 2022.

In July 2022, citing increased production costs and to "enable us to continue investing in ways that will keep driving this increasingly competitive industry forward for consumers and developers alike", it was announced that the prices of all current Meta Quest 2 SKUs would be increased by US$100 beginning in August 2022. It was concurrently announced that Beat Saber would also be bundled with the headset through the end of the year as a promotional offer. The 256 GB model was later reduced in price to US$429 in March 2023.

With the announcement of the upcoming Meta Quest 3 in June 2023 (which was released at a US$499 price point for its base 128 GB model), the 128 GB model was reduced back to US$299, and the 256 GB model was reduced to US$349. Meta CTO Andrew Bosworth has stated that the company will continue to support the Quest 2 "for quite a while". The Quest 2 began to be phased out from retail in July 2024.

During Meta Connect in September 2024, Meta officially discontinued the Quest 2, and unveiled a new entry-level model known as the Meta Quest 3S as a replacement at its $299 price point; its remaining stock was sold through the remainder of 2024.

In November 2026, Meta announced that it would wind down software support for the Quest 2 and Quest Pro, with OS feature updates ending in March 2027, and being limited to maintenance and security patches until the end of 2027.

=== Accessories ===
Facebook presented an "Elite Strap" accessory, which contains a ring-like pad for the back of the head and a tightness dial, along with a variant with a battery pack built into the strap. Facebook also promoted Logitech headphones "certified" for Quest 2, including the G333 VR—the company's first in-ear headphones—which have shortened cables designed for use with VR headsets.

In addition, Facebook partnered with Logitech to support their K830 keyboard as part of the "Infinite Office" feature, allowing the keyboard to be detected and displayed within a virtual reality environment.

In October 2022, Meta unveiled new Touch Pro controllers for the Meta Quest Pro, which are also available as an optional accessory for existing Quest 2 headsets. These controllers have a more compact design, replace the infrared tracking rings with cameras for on-board inside-out tracking (thus no longer needing to be within the line of sight of the headset's cameras for best performance), and also include a pressure sensor for pinching gestures, and rechargeable batteries.

== Reception ==
The Verge was positive in a pre-release review, noting that while it lacked standout features, it did have "worthwhile" improvements such as reduced weight, a screen with a better visual appearance and refresh rate than the original Quest, and a re-located USB port. The new strap was panned for having "less support and a slightly clumsier tightening mechanism" (partly rectified by the Elite Strap accessory sold separately), and the new IPD mechanism was considered "annoying" and not as inclusive as that of the first-generation model. In conclusion, it was argued that while it was not a "must-upgrade" for existing owners, the Quest 2 had "the best overall balance of hardware, features, and price."

Ars Technica was less positive, noting that its internal speakers were "noticeably crisper and louder", but panning the new cloth strap in comparison to the original Quest's elastic straps (and arguing that it alone was responsible for the claimed reduction in weight), the limited IPD options, worse battery life, and the controllers having less grip and reduced accuracy on more intensive games. The switch from OLED to LCD was shown to produce "crisper" images but more "washed out" color.

The Elite Strap accessory was met with criticism initially due to issues with the straps breaking randomly. In response, Facebook stated that the issue was a "processing inconsistency" affecting only a few units, and sales of the strap were paused temporarily before going on sale again. Other issues, such as loose screws in the strap were also reported.

=== Sales ===
In November 2021, Qualcomm stated that at least 10 million Quest 2 headsets had been shipped worldwide. In late-December 2021, the Oculus app (which is required to complete first-time setup) became the most popular app on the iOS App Store and Google Play Store in the United States for the first time—implying that Quest headsets had been heavily purchased as Christmas gifts during the holiday shopping season.

=== Facebook integration ===
The Quest 2 had faced criticism over the mandate that users must log in with a Facebook account in order to use the Quest 2 and any future Oculus products, including the amount of user data that could be collected by the company via virtual reality hardware and interactions, such as the user's surroundings, motions and actions, and biometrics. It was reported that some users were unable to use the headset due to their Facebook account being suspended. Some described that linking their deactivated Facebook account to the device rendered the headset a "paperweight". In September 2020, Facebook suspended the sale of all Oculus products in Germany after it faced criticism from the German Federal Cartel Office over the requirement. At the Facebook Connect event in 2021, Mark Zuckerberg stated that the company was "working on making it so you can log in into Quest with an account other than your personal Facebook account".

Meta later announced in July 2022 that it would establish a new "Meta account" system (a spiritual successor to Oculus accounts) to link Meta apps and platforms, and that users who transition to Meta account would be allowed to decouple their Facebook logins from its VR platforms. However, Ars Technica noted that the new terms of service and privacy policies associated with the new Meta account system could still allow enforcement of a real name policy, stating that users would be obligated to provide "accurate and up to date information (including registration information), which may include providing personal data", and still allowed for "rampant" use of user data by Meta.

=== Face pad recall ===
In December 2020, Facebook stated that it was investigating reports of users experiencing rashes and other skin irritation from the Quest 2's foam face pad. In April 2021, Facebook stated that it had identified and reduced the use of "a few trace substances that are normally present in the manufacturing process which could contribute to skin discomfort", but that they "did not find any contamination or unexpected substances in our manufacturing process." On July 27, 2021, Facebook announced that it had issued a recall of the face pads in Canada and the United States, would issue free silicone covers to existing users, and would temporarily suspend global sales of the Quest 2 in order to allow these covers to be included with all future shipments of the headset.
