= Meta Quest 3S =

Mixed reality headset

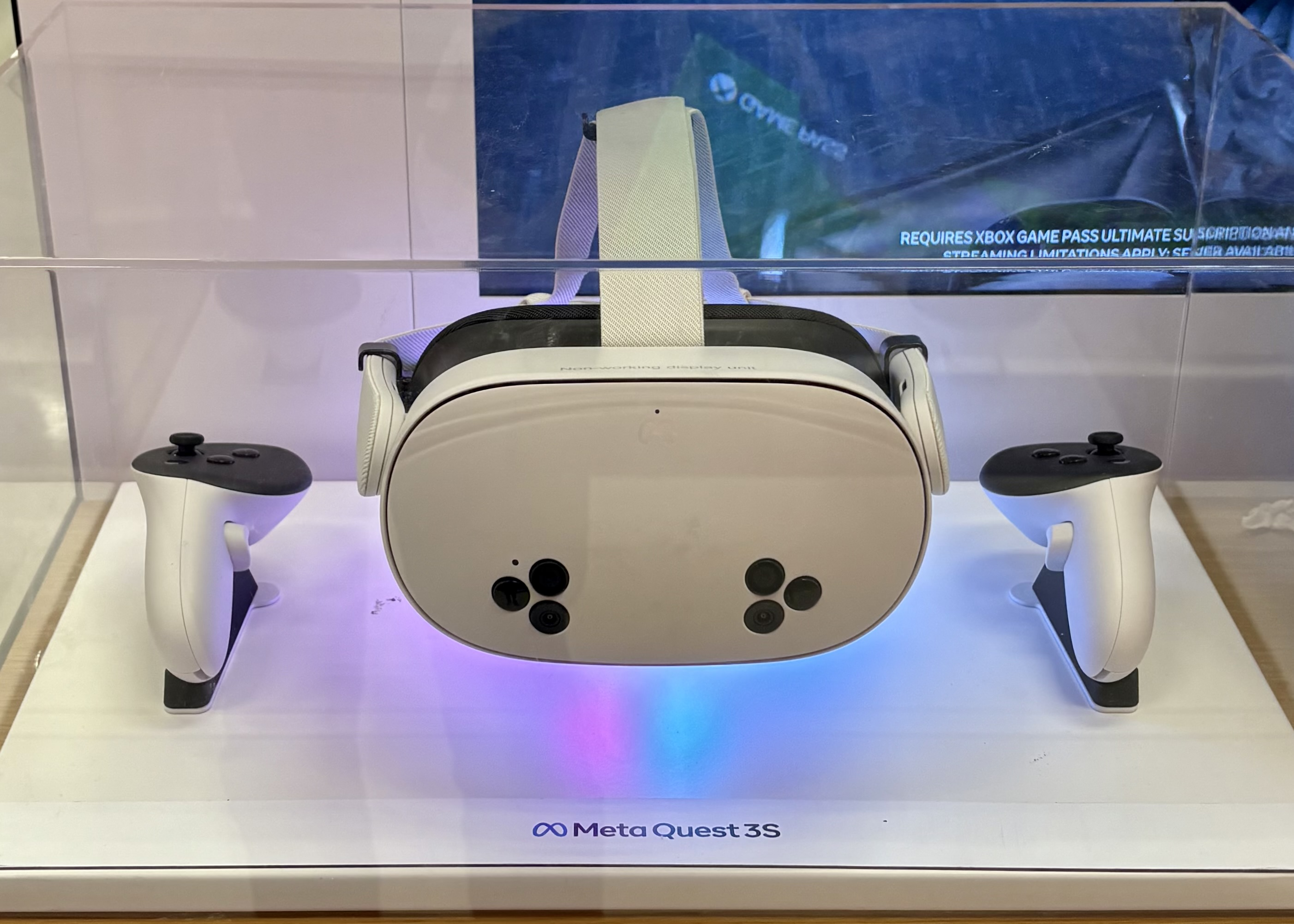
- Meta Quest 3S with its controllers
- Codename: "Panther"
- Developer: Reality Labs
- Manufacturer: Meta Horizon
- Type: Virtual reality headset; Mixed reality headset
- Released: October 15, 2024
- Lifespan: 2024–present
- Introductory price: US$299 (128 GB); US$399 (256 GB)
- Operating system: Meta Horizon OS, based on Android source code Current: Android 14
- System on a chip: Qualcomm Snapdragon XR2 Gen 2 (TSMC 4nm / N4X)
- CPU: 2x (big) Kryo (ARM Cortex-A715) + 4x (little) Kryo (ARM Cortex-A510) @ 2.05GHz
- Memory: 8 GB LPDDR4X @ 2600MT/s (42GB/s bandwidth)
- Storage: 128 GB, 256 GB
- Display: RGB-stripe single panel LCD - 1832x1920p per eye @ 90-120 Hz
- Graphics: Adreno 740 @ 640 MHz
- Sound: 2 built-in speakers, one built-in microphone
- Controller input: Touch Plus
- Camera: 2× 4MP RGB cameras 4× 400×400px IR cameras
- Connectivity: Wi-Fi 6E, Bluetooth 5.2
- Online services: Meta Quest Store
- Weight: 514 g
- Predecessor: Quest 2
- Related: Meta Quest 3
- Website: www.meta.com/quest/quest-3s/

Meta Quest 3S is a standalone virtual reality (VR) headset developed by Reality Labs, a division of Meta Platforms. It was unveiled on September 25, 2024 at Meta Connect, and released on October 15, 2024, as part of the third generation of the Meta Quest line.

It is intended as an entry-level model complementing 2023's Meta Quest 3, and succeeded the Quest 2 at its price point; it shares most of its hardware with the Quest 3, including an upgraded CPU and additional sensors and color passthrough cameras intended for mixed reality (MR) software, but utilizes optics and lower-resolution displays and inherited from the Quest 2.

The Quest 3S received positive reviews, with critics considering it an incremental update to the Quest 2 in comparison to the flagship Quest 3, and a good value for first-time VR users.

== Specifications ==
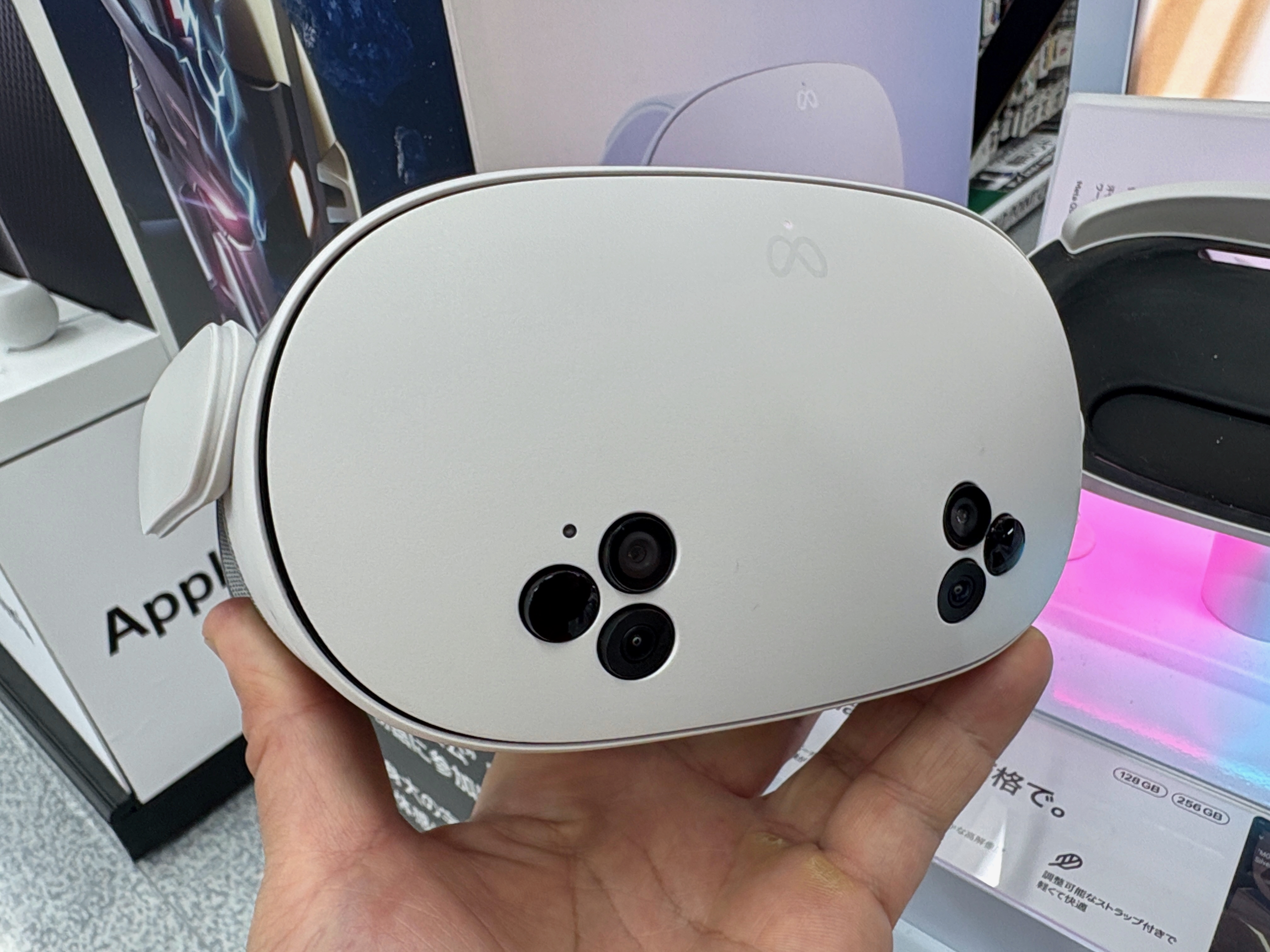
Close-up view of a Meta Quest 3S, prominently showing its passthrough cameras

The Quest 3S is designed as an entry-level variant of the Meta Quest 3; it uses the same Qualcomm Snapdragon XR2 Gen 2 system-on-chip with 8 GB of RAM, color passthrough cameras, and Touch Plus controllers as the Quest 3. Unlike the Quest 3, it uses Fresnel lenses instead of pancake lenses, and is thus thicker in length. Its displays are lower in resolution than the Quest 3, maintaining the same 1832×1920 per-eye resolution as the Quest 2, and it has a narrower field of view, 96 degrees horizontal compared to the Quest 3's 110°. It supports physical interpupillary distance (IPD) adjustment at 58 mm, 63 mm and 68 mm similarly to the Quest 2 (unlike the Quest 3, which switched back to supporting a range of IPD options).

It also lacks a depth sensor, with the Quest 3's three frontal "pills" replaced by two sets of sensors and cameras arranged in triangular patterns. It adds an additional hardware "action button" for toggling the passthrough cameras, as an alternative to the touch-based shortcut used on prior models.

== History ==
According to a roadmap obtained by The Verge in February 2023, Meta planned to release the Quest 3 in 2023, and another headset codenamed "Ventura" in 2024, which was reportedly described by Oculus VP Mark Rabkin as an "accessible" headset that would "pack the biggest punch we can at the most attractive price point in the VR consumer market". In October 2023, a Bloomberg News writer reported that Meta had been considering releasing a headset without motion controllers to reduce cost, relying primarily on hand tracking instead.

In late-May 2024, it was found that several upcoming games on the Meta Quest Store had listed compatibility with an unannounced device called the "Meta Quest 3S", seemingly confirming leaks posted on social media regarding a future headset codenamed "Panther". In June 2024, Meta CTO Andrew Bosworth posted a video which featured an unknown device in the background that matched previous 3S leaks. The Meta Quest 3S was officially unveiled during Meta Connect on September 25, officially replacing the Quest 2.

== Release ==
The Quest 3S was released on October 15. It is available in 128 GB and 256 GB models priced at US$299.99 and US$399.99 respectively, replacing the Quest 2 at its price point. Batman: Arkham Shadow was bundled with the Quest 3 and 3S from its release through April 30, 2025.

In June 2025, Meta announced a limited edition model known as the Quest 3S Xbox Edition; this variant features a black-colored hardware with green accents, and it is bundled with a matching Xbox Wireless Controller, with 128GB of storage, and a pre-installed Elite Strap. It also includes three-month subscriptions to Xbox Game Pass and Meta Horizon+. This model was priced at US$399.

== Reception ==
TechRadar felt that the Quest 3S had overall gaming and mixed reality performance on par with that of the Quest 3 (with the latter being despite its lack of a depth sensor), but that it was not as comfortable, reverted back to the limited IPD presets of the Quest 2, and had an "obvious" screen-door effect due to its lower-res displays. The Verge felt that although the Quest 3S "doesn’t solve VR's inherent tradeoffs and limitations", and was more of a modest update for Quest 2 users due to its compromises over the Quest 3, it was well-suited for first-time VR headset owners due to its overall value and positioning, accessibility, game library, and bundled software.
