= Meta Quest =

Line of virtual reality headsets

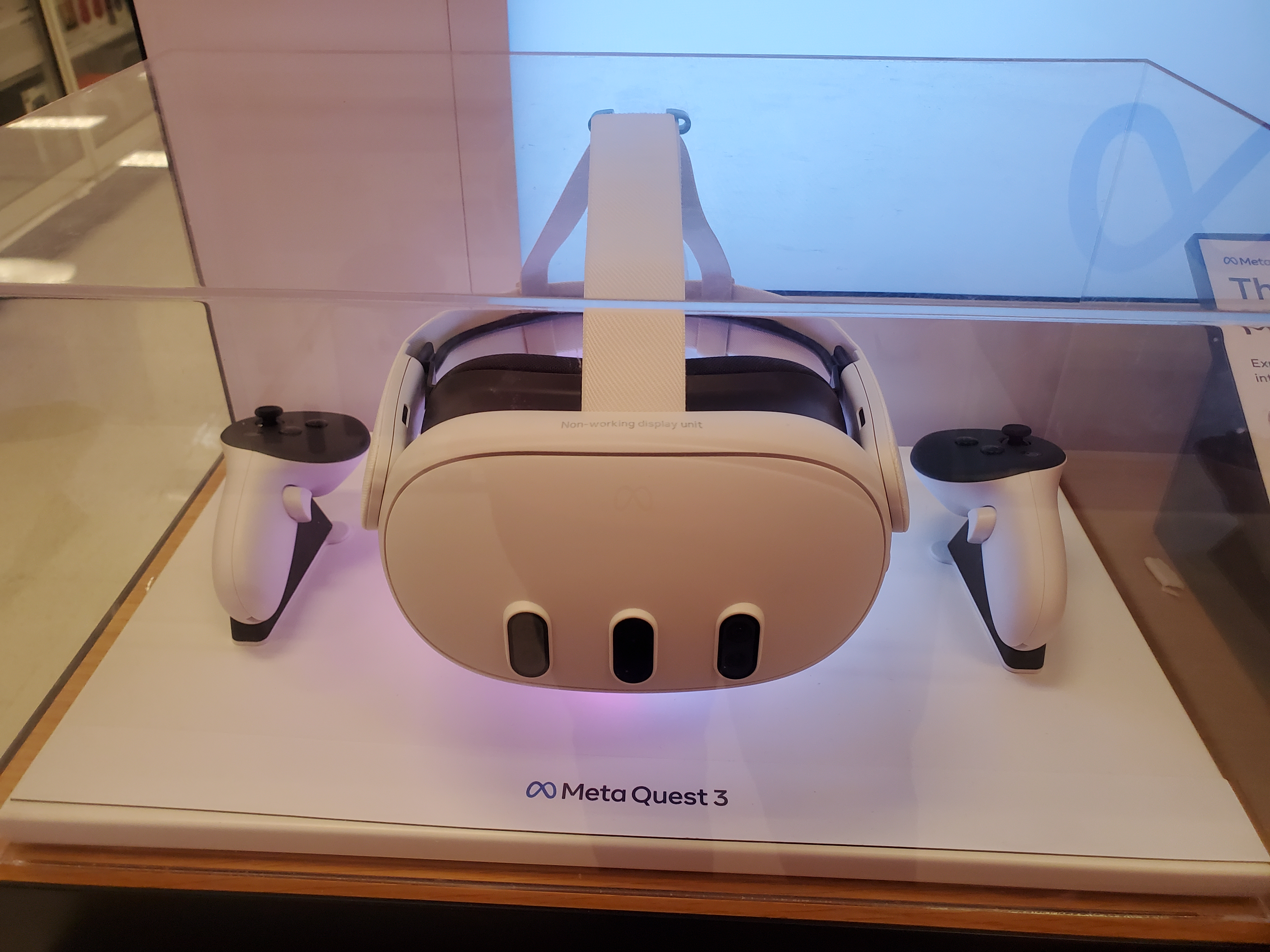
A Meta Quest 3 with Touch Plus controllers

The Meta Quest, initially the Oculus Quest until August 2022, is a line of virtual reality headsets with augmented reality capabilities developed by Reality Labs, a division of Meta. The first-generation Oculus Quest was developed by Oculus (then a brand of Facebook, later a division of Meta Platform known as Reality Labs) and released on May 21, 2019. Since then, Facebook (Meta Platforms) has released new Quest models and Quest OS (Horizon OS) updates. As of February 2023, over 20 million total Quest headsets had been sold.

== Summary ==
Similar to its predecessor, Oculus Go, the Quest line is a standalone device, that can run games and software wirelessly under the Android-based Quest operating system. It supports positional tracking with six degrees of freedom, using internal sensors and an array of cameras in the front of the headset rather than external sensors, and supports hand tracking. The line also supports "Oculus Link", a feature that allows the Quest to be connected to a computer via USB, enabling use with Oculus Rift-compatible software and games. It was the first device from Meta to support augmented reality via "Passthrough", which shows a view from the cameras when the user exits their designated boundary area known as "Guardian". Since the Meta Quest Pro, Quest models have supported color passthrough.

The Quest series is the largest headset platform for virtual and augmented reality in the world as of 2025.

== Models ==
Model	Release date	With OS version	Discontinued	End of support
Oculus Quest	May 21, 2019	v7	September 2020	August 31, 2024
Quest 2	October 13, 2020	v23	September 2024	
Meta Quest Pro	October 25, 2022	v46	September 2024	
Meta Quest 3	October 10, 2023	v59-present	N/A	
Meta Quest 3S	October 15, 2024	v71-present	N/A	

== Technical details ==
Model	System on a chip	Memory	Storage	Display	Graphics	Sound	Input	Controller input	Cameras	Connectivity	Online services	Power	Mass	Introductory price
Oculus Quest	Qualcomm Snapdragon 835	4 GB LPDDR4X	64 GB, 128 GB	PenTile OLED 1440 × 1600 per eye @ 72 Hz	Adreno 540 @ 670 MHz (up to 343 GFLOPS)	Integrated stereo speakers; 2 × 3.5 mm headphone jack	6DOF inside-out tracking through 4 built-in cameras	Oculus Touch	4 cameras	USB-C; Bluetooth 5; Wi-Fi 5	Quest Store	N/A	571 g (20.1 oz)	US$399 (64 GB) US$499 (128 GB)
Quest 2	Qualcomm Snapdragon XR2	6 GB LPDDR4X	64 GB, 128 GB, 256 GB	RGB LCD 1832 x 1920 per eye @ 72 - 120 Hz	Adreno 650 @ 587 MHz (up to 902 GFLOPS)	2 built-in speakers / 2 built-in microphones / 3.5mm headphone jack	6DOF inside-out tracking through 4 built-in cameras and 2 controllers with accelerometers, gyroscopes, 2 triggers, 2 buttons, a joystick, and a wrist strap	Oculus Touch	4 infrared cameras	USB-C; Bluetooth 5; Wi-Fi 6	Quest Store	N/A	503 g (17.7 oz)	US$299 (64 GB) US$249 (128 GB) US$399 (256 GB)
Meta Quest Pro	Qualcomm Snapdragon XR2+ Gen 1	12 GB LPDDR5	256 GB	2x MiniLED LCD w/ Quantum Dot layer + >500 zone FALD, 1800 x 1920 per eye @ 72 - 90 Hz	Adreno 650 @ 587 MHz (up to 902 GFLOPS)	N/A	Inside-Out 6DoF tracking with 5 internal and 5 external cameras, with 2 self-tracking controllers with standalone optical sensors, accelerometers and gyroscopes, and hand-tracking	Touch Pro	5 internal and 5 external cameras	Wi-Fi 6E	Quest Store	N/A	722 g (25.5 oz)	US$1,499.99
Meta Quest 3	Qualcomm Snapdragon XR2 Gen 2	8 GB LPDDR5	128 GB, 512 GB	2× 2064 × 2208p RGB-stripe LCD panels, one per eye @ 90–120 Hz	Adreno 740 @ 599 MHz (up to 1.84 TFLOPS)	2 built-in speakers	Inside-Out 6DoF tracking with 2 internal and 4 external cameras, with 2 controllers with accelerometers and gyroscopes, and hand-tracking	Touch Plus	2× 4MP RGB camera 4× 400×400px IR camera	Wi-Fi 6E, Bluetooth 5.2	Quest Store	Li-ion 3.87 VDC 4879 mAh	515 g (18.2 oz)	US$499 (128GB)/US$649 (512GB)
Meta Quest 3S	Qualcomm Snapdragon XR2 Gen 2	8 GB LPDDR5	128 GB, 256 GB	2x MiniLED LCD w/ Quantum Dot layer + >500 zone FALD, 1800 x 1920 per eye @ 90 - 120 Hz	Adreno 740 @ 599 MHz (up to 1.84 TFLOPS)	2 built-in speakers	6 DoF Inside-out via 4 integrated cameras, with 2 controllers with accelerometers and gyroscopes, and hand-tracking	Touch Plus	2× 4MP RGB camera 4× 400×400px IR camera	Wi-Fi 6E, Bluetooth 5.2	Quest Store	N/A	514 g (18.1 oz)	US$299 (128GB)/US$399 (256GB)

== See also ==
- List of Meta Quest games
