= Meta Quest 3 =

Mixed/virtual reality headset

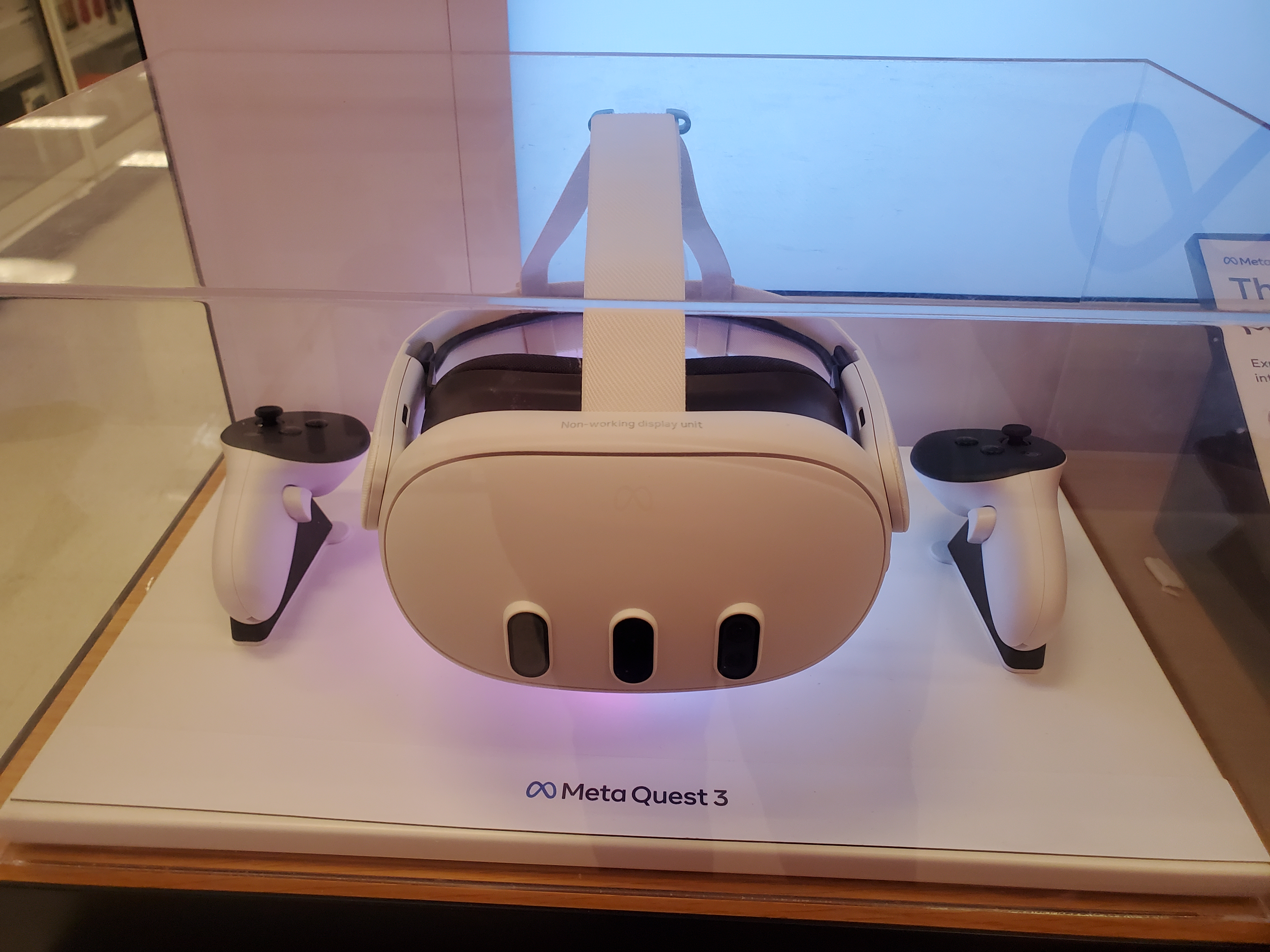
- Meta Quest 3 with its controllers
- Codename: "Stinson" "Eureka"
- Developer: Reality Labs
- Type: Virtual reality headset; Mixed reality headset
- Released: October 10, 2023
- Lifespan: 2023–present
- Introductory price: US$499 (128 GB); US$649 (512 GB)
- Operating system: Meta Horizon OS, based on Android source code Current: Android 14 Original: Android 12.1L
- System on a chip: Qualcomm Snapdragon XR2 Gen 2 / SXR2230P (Samsung 4LPX / 4nm)
- CPU: 2x (big) Kryo (ARM Cortex-A715) + 4x (little) Kryo (ARM Cortex-A510) @ 2.36GHz
- Memory: 8 GB LPDDR5 @ 4200MT/s (68GB/s bandwidth)
- Storage: 128 GB, 512 GB
- Display: 2× 2064×2208p RGB-stripe LCD+ panels, one per eye @ 90–120 Hz
- Graphics: Adreno 740 @ 640MHz
- Sound: 2 built-in speakers, one built-in microphone
- Controller input: Touch Plus
- Camera: 2× 4MP RGB cameras, 4× 400×400px IR cameras
- Connectivity: Wi-Fi 6E, Bluetooth 5.2
- Power: Li-ion 3.87 VDC, 4879 mAh
- Online services: Meta Quest Store
- Weight: 515 g (18.2 oz)
- Backward compatibility: Partially. APKs older than Android 14 (API level 34) may fail to load.
- Predecessor: Quest 2
- Related: Meta Quest 3S
- Website: www.meta.com/quest/quest-3/

Meta Quest 3 is a standalone virtual reality (VR) headset developed by Reality Labs, a division of Meta Platforms. It was unveiled on June 1, 2023, and released on October 10, succeeding the Quest 2 as the third generation of the Meta Quest line.

As with its predecessors, the Quest 3 is a standalone device running Meta Horizon OS, a derivative of Android Open Source Project (AOSP); VR games and apps can be run natively on the headset, or streamed from a PC over USB-C or Wi-Fi. The Quest 3 features updated hardware with elements of the Quest Pro, including a thinner form factor and pancake lenses, and additional sensors and color passthrough cameras intended for mixed reality (MR) software.

The headset received positive reviews, with critics noting its slimmer build and performance improvements over the Quest 2, but panning its passthrough cameras for their clarity and a relative lack of MR experiences at launch, and its relatively unchanged system software.

== Specifications ==
=== Hardware ===
The Quest 3's design is an evolution of that of the Quest 2, combined with elements of the Meta Quest Pro. It uses a pair of LCDs with a per-eye resolution of 2064×2208p, which is a roughly 30% increase over the 1832×1920p resolution of the Quest 2.

And the effective resolution increase in headset is even higher due to each eye seeing the entire screen at all times because of its two movable displays, instead of only part of a single panel. Quest 2/3S' stationary single display with movable lenses led to lost pixels needed for the other IPD settings at the edges that you couldn't see.

This change from a single immobile display to two movable displays has been calculated using the Quest Pro (as it's just ~3% under Quest 2's resolution but uses dual panels) to provide around a ~+10-15% increase in PPD ("pixels per degree"), aka pixel density or visible pixels in headset. This means that Quest 3 actually has a total effective resolution increase over Quest 2/3S of around ~+40-45%.

Said new dual LCD panels are viewed through in-house custom-designed 2x element pancake lenses (similar to those in the Quest Pro) to enable significantly better image clarity from edge to edge, FOV improvement, and a 40% thinner device enclosure. It returns to an inter-pupillary distance (IPD) mechanism similar to the first-generation Quest, allowing it to be set between 53 mm and 75 mm using a scroll wheel (as opposed to the Quest 2, which only supported three preset distances and used a single screen panel).

The face of the headset is adorned with three "pills" containing sensors and cameras. The two outer pills each contain a hybrid monochrome visible light/infrared camera whose captured format alternates between frames, and which are used for positional tracking of both the headset itself (using the monochrome feed for "inside-out" optical SLAM) and the Touch Plus controllers (using the IR feed to track embedded IR LEDs), along with a 4 MP RGB color camera for mixed reality passthrough. And in addition to the two located inside said outer pills on the device's front, there are another two of these exact same dual role IR tracking cameras on the bottom left and right sides of the headset (giving it 4x in total) so as to give it a suitably large tracking volume.

The center pill contains an IR patterned light emitter in line projector form (marketed as a depth sensor), which is used in combination with the two front facing IR cameras to understand the depth and distance of the user's surroundings for boundaries and mixed reality experiences.

The Quest 3 uses the Snapdragon XR2 Gen 2, a system-on-chip manufactured by Qualcomm and based on their Snapdragon 8 Gen 2 flagship mobile phone SoC, which Meta has touted as having more than twice the raw graphics (GPU) performance of the Snapdragon XR2 Gen 1 used by the Quest 2 and other similar standalone headsets.

The headset ships with "Touch Plus" controllers; they are similar in design to the Touch Pro controllers used by Quest Pro, and replace the infrared sensor ring with infrared sensors in the body of the controller, augmented by internal sensors and input from the headset's hand tracking. Unlike the Touch Pro controllers, they do not use a dedicated processor and cameras for on-board positional tracking, and are powered by AA batteries rather than rechargeable batteries. Quest 3 is also compatible with the Touch Pro controllers.

In December 2023, an API was added for inside-out body tracking, which uses computer vision and the headset's side cameras to track upper body and arm motions. This can be combined with the "generative legs" API (which uses a machine learning model to estimate the motion of the user's legs) to provide a degree of full-body motion tracking without additional sensors. A depth API was also added to improve the quality of mixed reality rendering.

=== Software ===
The Quest 3 is backward compatible with all Quest 2 software. Existing software may receive updates to add higher fidelity graphics (including high resolution textures) when running on Quest 3; due to platform limitations, it is difficult to distribute separate packages targeting Quest 2 and Quest 3 on Quest Store, which may result in software consuming additional storage on Quest 2 due to the inclusion of Quest 3-specific assets in a unified package.

During a private presentation to employees, Meta virtual reality vice president Mark Rabkin stated that there were plans for 41 new Quest apps and games to be released at launch; during a digital presentation on June 1, 2023, Meta showcased Quest titles scheduled for the late-2023 launch window such as Assassin's Creed Nexus VR, Asgard's Wrath 2, Ghostbusters: Rise of the Ghost Lord, I Expect You to Die 3, Onward, PowerWash Simulator, Samba de Amigo: Virtual Party, Stranger Things VR, and Vampire: The Masquerade — Justice among others. During Connect, Meta announced that Xbox Cloud Gaming would be available as an app for Meta Quest 3 in December 2023.

== Release ==
According to a roadmap obtained by The Verge in February 2023, Meta planned for the Quest 3, internally codenamed "Stinson", to be released later that year. The Verge's roadmap corroborated files on the Quest 3, including schematics, shared in September 2022 by virtual reality analyst Brad Lynch.

Ahead of an official announcement, Bloomberg writer Mark Gurman published a newsletter on May 28, 2023, reporting from a private event where he had received a hands-on demo of a Quest 3 prototype codenamed "Eureka". Ahead of a VR gaming digital presentation later that day, Meta officially revealed the Quest 3 on June 1, 2023 via a video on Mark Zuckerberg's Instagram account. The teaser announced that the Quest 3 would be released in late 2023, and be priced at US$499.99 for a 128 GB model (with larger storage options to be announced in the future). Several publications noted the timing of the announcement, as it came four days prior to Apple's Worldwide Developers Conference (WWDC)—where the company was expected to announce an augmented reality headset the Apple Vision Pro.

The Meta Quest 3 was announced at Meta Connect 2023 confirming the price, and features. It was made available for pre-order on September 28, 2023, with orders shipping the following month and was released on October 10, 2023, and the 128 GB and 512 GB models priced at US$499.99 and US$649.99 respectively. All pre-order units were bundled with Asgard's Wrath 2, and pre-orders of the 512 GB model were also bundled with six months of Meta Quest+ subscription service. Initially the Quest 3 would co-exist with the Quest 2 at retail, with the Quest 2 being positioned as an entry-level model, and Meta CTO Andrew Bosworth stating that they would continue to support the Quest 2 "for quite a while".

On September 25, 2024, Meta unveiled the Quest 3S as a new entry-level model to replace the Quest 2 at its US$299.99 price point for a 128 GB model. As a result, it was announced that the 128 GB Quest 3 would be phased out (with its price lowered to US$429.99 while stock remains), and the 512 GB model would be lowered to US$499.99. It was also announced that new Quest 3 and 3S purchases would be bundled with Batman: Arkham Shadow from then through April 30, 2025.

== Reception ==
In a hands-on report published prior to the official unveiling, Bloomberg writer Mark Gurman found that the new AR passthrough mode was significantly better than any previous Meta products (including Quest Pro), with it being good enough to clearly read and use one's phone through, but that controller tracking was less accurate. Meta explained that it will improve the controller tracking accuracy over time before launch with a variety of already discovered but then not yet implemented tracking technologies and software updates.

Wired praised the upgraded hardware of the Quest 3, and its form factor for having a more comfortable and "secure" fit. It was felt that the color passthrough cameras were better than the previous monochrome cameras, but still had a blurry appearance, and that the available apps did not use mixed reality to its full potential. The user interface was also criticized for being largely unchanged from past models, lacking in application management functions, and having unclear migration paths for cloud save data from previous Quest headsets. In conclusion, it was argued that "everything it does, it does well, but it does nothing at the apex of its class", and that the Quest 3 "might not be enough to make mainstream adoption of VR or MR an actual reality."

Polygon similarly praised the technical and ergonomic updates to the Quest 3, and described the device as being "much more complete out of the box, with fewer obvious areas for improvement than the Quest 2". It was noted that not many games had been specifically updated for Quest 3 at launch, but that those which did had improved visual fidelity (such as Red Matter 2, which was described as approaching the fidelity of Half-Life: Alyx), and that performance improvements were not universal among existing titles not yet updated. It was argued that the headset's library of native software had "worthwhile experiences", but that "Meta's feed of new, interesting games is slow compared to the release rhythm set by traditional game consoles", and that the Quest 3 "feels kind of like a mid-generation console refresh, but without the benefit of having dozens of amazing games that feel greatly improved out of the gate."
