= Meta Horizon OS =

Operating system for the Meta Quest product line

- Logo of the Meta Horizon platform (2024-present)
- Developer: Meta Platforms, Inc.
- Written in: Java, Kotlin (UI), C (core), C++, Rust and others
- OS family: Unix-like (modified Linux kernel), (Android 14)
- Working state: Current
- Source model: Open source, freeware (most devices include proprietary components)
- Latest release: v2.7 / Sept 24th, 2026
- Latest preview: v2.9 / Sept 27th, 2026
- Marketing target: Extended reality headsets, Meta Quest headsets
- Update method: Over-the-air/Sideloading
- Package manager: APK-based
- Kernel type: Monolithic (Linux kernel)
- License: Proprietary software with open-source components; Apache License 2.0 for Android userspace software; GNU GPL v2 for the Linux kernel modifications

Support status
- Supported

Meta Horizon OS, previously known informally as Meta Quest Platform or Meta Quest OS, is an Android-based extended reality operating system for the Meta Quest line of devices released by Meta Platforms. Initially developed for the embedded operating system on the Oculus Rift and Oculus Rift S, the platform has been based on the Android operating system since the release of the Oculus Go in 2018. It first supported augmented reality via grayscale camera passthrough upon the release of the Oculus Quest in 2019, and has supported color passthrough since the release of the Meta Quest Pro in 2022.

On April 22, 2024, the company announced that the platform would be rebranded as Meta Horizon OS.

== History ==
The platform was first developed by Oculus VR for the embedded operating system on the Oculus Rift DK1 (Development Kit 1), which was released to developers in 2013.

Development of the software platform increased following the March 2014 acquisition of Oculus VR (now the Reality Labs division of Meta). Under Facebook, Oculus VR collaborated with Samsung to develop the Android-based Samsung Gear VR headset, with the Oculus VR division porting Oculus Home, Oculus Store, Oculus Cinema (later Video) apps and other necessary application software, and developing the Oculus Mobile SDK, tracking sensor firmware, optimized Android and the required GPU drivers for virtual reality. do not buy third-parties to produce their own headsets, with initial partners including Asus (which was developing a headset oriented towards the gaming market), Lenovo (which was working on "mixed reality devices for productivity, learning, and entertainment"), and Microsoft (which was to partner on a special Xbox-branded Quest). However in December 2025, it was announced by Meta that this program had been "paused" in order to focus on first-party hardware.

=== Community use ===
In addition, the entire source for the Rift DK1 was released to the public in September 2014, including the firmware, schematics, and mechanicals for the device. The firmware is released under a simplified BSD license, while the schematics and mechanicals are released under a Creative Commons Attribution 4.0 International License.

In October 2021, Facebook released an update to the Oculus Go which can be sideloaded to unlock "full root access" to the device hardware. This update, which is irreversible and blocks further OTA updates, is supposed to keep devices operational for users even after official Facebook cloud infrastructure for the device goes offline.

== Development ==
Since v7, Meta Horizon OS runs on the most recent versions of the Android Open Source Project, a mobile-oriented operating system based on a modified version of the Linux kernel and other open-source software. The AOSP core is free and open-source software (FOSS) primarily licensed under the Apache License. Horizon OS also includes proprietary software developed by Meta, including SDKs supporting the 3D user interface.

Updates to Meta Horizon OS are released on an almost-monthly basis.

== Features ==
=== User interface and built-in components ===
Horizon OS uses a 3D user interface navigated via hand controllers, finger tracking and speech recognition on all headsets, as well as facial motion capture and eye tracking on the Quest Pro in particular. A default installation of Horizon OS contains a minimal selection of software, including Horizon Home, Quest Browser and Messenger. Horizon OS supports a virtual keyboard, Meta AI virtual assistant (as of v68), and speech recognition for text input by default, as well as optional recognition of third-party physical keyboards and external Bluetooth peripherals.

==== Virtual space setup ====
Horizon OS requires users to use the Guardian system to set boundaries within virtual space for physical safety, with the options to establish "Stationary" boundaries around one's immediate vicinity or "Roomscale" boundaries for the entire room in which the virtual space is located. The automatic, AI-assisted Roomscale approach allows for "Space Sense" in Guardian to show outlines of real-world objects, people, and pets up to 9 feet away within the virtual space.

OS v65 and later versions support Travel Mode for the Quest 2, 3 and 3s, allowing users to use either headset in a seated position during airplane flights and, since v71, train trips. Travel Mode does not support use of Meta controllers.

==== Windowing system and menus ====
Apps in Horizon OS are displayed in floating 2D windows which can be arranged in 3D space. Users are able to switch between multiple windows to launch, focus, minimize, and close any open apps that support multitasking. Users are also able to grab and detach open windows to position and resize them freely, as well as to expand a window to fullscreen size.

Initially allowing support for opening up to three Quest Browser windows at once in v15, windows were later allowed in v37 to be resized in virtual space (initially for certain apps which support multitasking). A "New Window Layout", released experimentally in v67 and finalized in v69, increased the number of open windows as well as the number of controls over each window.

Horizon OS makes use of a persistent Universal Menu Dock, which contains shortcuts for quick navigation between windows, navigation of the store, access to content, and control of basic settings and features. The Universal Menu floats in front of the user in both Immersive and Passthrough views.

During Connect in September 2024, Meta revealed an upcoming user interface update for Horizon OS, replacing the existing dashboard menus with a new full-screen home screen overlay known as the "navigator" (akin to the "Home View" menu overlay in VisionOS) and redesigning the Universal Menu. Meta began to test Navigator on its public test channel (PTC) for selected users of v77 in May 2025. Users expressed negative feedback to the gray background of the Navigator, which resulted in removal of the background in favor of an opaque, darkened background in July 2025, expressly at the order of Meta CTO Andrew Bosworth. After a further preview of Navigator during demos of Horizon OS at Connect in 2025, Meta updated and redesigned test version of Navigator was released to the v83 PTC on October 27, 2025.

==== Immersive and Passthrough Views ====
Largely since the launch of v7 for the Oculus Quest, Horizon OS has made use of two user interface modes: "Immersive view", or fully-virtual spaces, and "Passthrough", or mixed-reality spaces utilizing the real-world camera on the headset. Initially appearing as a grayscale camera feed and marketed as part of the Guardian safety feature, Passthrough was first made available in color in v47 for the Quest Pro. Color Passthrough has since become a central feature of Horizon OS and numerous apps. The Universal Menu and windows remain persistent in both Immersive and Passthrough views at the user's discretion.

==== Avatars ====
Setup of the operating system on the headset requires the installation of the Meta Horizon app on the user's smartphone, which includes the ability to design the user's initial avatar, initial pairing with the headset, setup of one's method of in-headset payment for Horizon apps, and installation of apps from the Horizon Store. Upon completion of the setup for the Horizon app on the smartphone, the headset loads the default Horizon Home environment. The avatar is used by default when a user joins the Horizon Worlds game.

Since February 2016, speech recognition on the operating system has allowed for the control of synchronized lip movements on avatars utilizing the OVRLipSync feature. In December 2024, OVRLipSync was replaced in Horizon OS v71 by the Audio to Expression feature, an onboard AI-driven feature which extends the speech recognition to generate approximate facial gestures on one's avatar and compensate for a lack of face- and eye-tracking on the Quest 2, 3 and 3s. On the Quest Pro, facial capture and eye tracking sensors allow for more direct control of facial expressions on one's avatar.

In Horizon OS v59, legs were added for avatars, utilizing a combination of upper-body movement tracking and onboard generative AI to approximate leg movements.

=== Supported software ===
The primary means of installing software on Quest devices is through the Horizon Store. In addition to games, the platform also offers VR versions of several non-game apps. VR-capable social games include Horizon Worlds, VRChat and Roblox.

The Oculus Quest and subsequent devices support "Meta Horizon Link" (formerly known as "Oculus Link"), an OpenVR and OpenXR runtime that allows for PC VR games to be displayed on supported headsets connected via USB. In April 2021, Oculus released "Air Link," an alternative mode that uses WiFi for connectivity instead of USB. SteamVR, another OpenVR and OpenXR runtime, also supports several Quest headsets.

The Oculus Go was released with Oculus Gallery, Oculus Video, Oculus TV, Oculus Venues and Oculus Rooms preinstalled. Rooms was discontinued on October 25, 2019. Gradually, support for Oculus Go-compatible apps was discontinued.

=== Supported media ===
WebXR, an API for mixed reality experiences through web browsers, is supported in the Quest Browser.

As of v62, Horizon OS supports in-headset playback of spatial video, depth-mapped 3D video recorded on Apple Vision Pro or iPhone 15 Pro.

== Issues ==
=== v72 ===
Following the release of v72, several users of Quest 2, 3 and 3s reported failed updates resulting in being unable to boot into Horizon OS, with a black screen appearing with the error "Your device is corrupt. It can't be trusted." Meta initially responded on December 28, 2024 by reporting that the issue with software was fixed. On December 30, Meta responded to further reports of unusable headsets by offering free replacements and store credits for those affected, including refurbished replacements for those whose headsets are outside of the warranty period. A patch for v72 was issued on January 9, 2025. On January 19, 2025, Mark Rabkin, Meta's Vice President of Horizon OS and Quest, blamed a four-year old bug in Android file system which could cause file corruption during read/write operations, which was exacerbated by a security patch that prevented the operating system from rolling back. The issue was not attributed to v72, but the rollout of v72 was temporarily halted to diagnose the bug.

== See also ==
- Android XR
- visionOS
- Windows Mixed Reality
- SteamOS
