= Meta Quest Pro =

Virtual reality headset

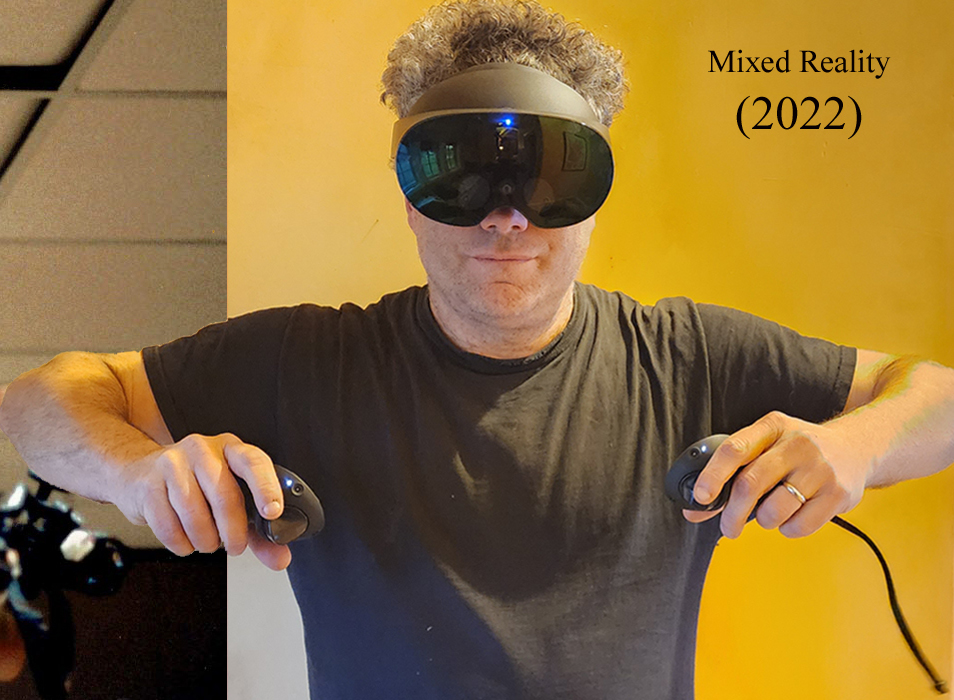
- A man wearing a Meta Quest Pro and holding its controllers
- Codename: Seacliff, Project Cambria
- Developer: Reality Labs
- Type: Virtual reality headset
- Released: October 25, 2022
- Lifespan: 2022-2024
- Introductory price: US$1,499.99
- Operating system: Meta Horizon OS, based on Android source code
- System on a chip: Qualcomm Snapdragon XR2+ Gen 1
- Memory: 12 GB LPDDR5
- Storage: 256 GB
- Display: 2x MiniLED LCD w/ Quantum Dot layer + >500 zone FALD, 1800 x 1920 per eye @ 72 - 90 Hz
- Graphics: Adreno 650 @ 587 MHz (Up to 902 GFLOPS FP32)
- Controller input: Touch Pro
- Connectivity: Wi-Fi 6E USB-C Bluetooth 5.2
- Online services: Meta Quest Store
- Weight: 722 g (25.5 oz)
- Website: Official website

The Meta Quest Pro is a discontinued mixed reality (MR) headset developed by Reality Labs, a division of Meta Platforms.

The Meta Quest Pro was Unveiled on October 11, 2022 and released on October 25, 2022. it is a high-end headset designed for mixed reality and virtual reality applications, targeting business and enthusiast users. It is differentiated from the Quest 2 by a thinner form factor leveraging pancake lenses, high resolution cameras for MR, integrated face and eye tracking, and updated controllers with on-board motion tracking.

The Quest Pro received mixed reviews, with critics praising its display and controllers, but criticizing its mixed reality cameras for having a grainy appearance and limited usefulness in its software at launch, and for its high price. Meta discontinued the Quest Pro in favor of the Meta Quest 3S in September 2024, with sales ending in January 2025.

== Development ==
Prior to Facebook Connect in October 2021 (during which Facebook, Inc. announced its rebranding as "Meta" to emphasize its development of "metaverse"-related technologies), CEO Mark Zuckerberg and CTO Andrew Bosworth posted photos of themselves testing prototype headsets, which they stated to have "Retina resolution" displays (alluding to the Apple Inc. trademark for high-resolution displays), while leaked demo videos and references to an "Oculus Pro" headset were also discovered on the Oculus website and unreleased system software. During the event, Zuckerberg officially announced that the company was developing a headset codenamed "Project Cambria" as part of the Oculus Quest line of products, which would be a high-end product aimed at mixed reality applications, and feature a slimmer design, high-resolution color passthrough cameras, infrared depth sensors, and eye tracking.

The product was officially revealed as Meta Quest Pro during Connect in October 2022 for a release on October 25; Zuckerberg told the media that the Quest Pro would target "people who just want the highest-end VR device – enthusiast, prosumer folks – or people who are trying to get work done", and would be sold in parallel with the Quest 2 (which is aimed primarily at the consumer market). Bosworth stated that the Quest Pro would "take existing experiences that people are having today in VR and make them better." The planned depth sensor was dropped from the final hardware due to cost and weight concerns.

== Specifications ==
=== Hardware ===
The Quest Pro more closely resembles AR headsets such as Microsoft's HoloLens rather than other VR headsets, with a thinner lens enclosure, and a more visor-like form factor that does not obscure the entirety of the user's peripheral vision; "peripheral blinders" are included as an accessory, with a "full light blocker" attachment sold separately. The lenses can be adjusted for interpupillary distance, and moved forwards and backwards. It uses LCD quantum dot displays with a per-eye resolution of 1800×1920, viewed through pancake lenses that allow for its enclosure to be 40% thinner in comparison to the Quest 2. Meta stated that the displays supported a wider color gamut than the Quest 2, and had improved contrast via "local dimming". The Quest Pro's battery is built into the back of its head strap for better weight distribution; Meta rated it as lasting 1 to 2 hours on a single charge.

For its mixed reality functions, the Quest Pro uses high-resolution color cameras, as opposed to the lower-resolution, grayscale cameras on the Quest. The headset also contains internal sensors that are used for eye and face tracking, primarily for use with avatars. The Quest Pro uses a Qualcomm Snapdragon XR2+ system-on-chip with 12 GB of RAM, which Meta stated had "50% more power" than the Quest 2's Snapdragon XR.

The Quest Pro uses Touch Pro controllers, a significant update to the Oculus Touch controllers used by prior Quest and Rift products. They have a more compact design with upgraded haptics, and replace the infrared sensor ring (which were tracked by the headset's cameras) with on-board motion tracking using embedded cameras and Qualcomm Snapdragon 662 processors. The controllers are also rechargeable via the headset's charging dock, have a new pressure sensor for pinch gestures, and have pressure-sensitive stylus tip accessories that can be attached to the bottoms of their handles for drawing and writing. The Quest Pro controllers are also sold separately as an accessory for Quest 2 and newer.

=== Software ===
The Quest Pro was demonstrated to the press with mixed reality versions of software such as Horizon Workrooms (which allows users to attend meetings, and control their computer remotely in VR with a virtual multi-monitor environment), the DJ software Tribe XR, and Painting VR.

Meta announced a partnership with Microsoft to integrate productivity services such as Microsoft 365, Microsoft Teams, and Windows 365 with Meta Quest 2 and Pro, including allowing users to join Teams meetings via Horizon Workrooms, use Microsoft 365 applications, as well as support for management of Quest devices via Intune.

In December 2023, Valve Corporation released Steam Link for Meta Quest 2, Quest Pro, and Quest 3, with OSC support for facial and eye tracking on Quest Pro.

== Reception ==
The Quest Pro received mixed reviews. Ars Technica noted that its design felt less "claustrophobic" and "much more secure and better balanced than previous Quest headsets, especially during extended use", but noting that its narrow field of view was more apparent when using the headset without its light blinder accessories. Its display and lenses were described as being slightly sharper and having more legible text rendering than the Quest 2, making it better-suited for office tasks and using a remote desktop environment in Workrooms. The MR cameras were panned for being grainy and "fuzzy"-looking, while many of the MR features in apps at launch were deemed to be "novelties". It was also criticized for requiring manual room setup, rather than automatically mapping walls. In conclusion, it was felt that "at its current asking price, though, we can only recommend the Quest Pro to mid-level executives who have convinced their superiors to allocate a ridiculous, money-is-no-object budget to ill-defined metaverse projects out of nothing more than a deep sense of FOMO."

Adi Robertson of The Verge described the device as "seemingly launched without plan or purpose, highlighting VR’s persistent drawbacks without making good use of its strengths — and topped off with some irredeemably bad software". The new controllers were praised for being more compact than the previous Oculus Touch design and offering a charging dock with rechargeable batteries (albeit having less battery life than the previous controllers, which used standard AA batteries). The Quest Pro was criticized for having a "uniquely tortuous" strap system that felt worse when using the headset for extended sessions (in comparison to the Quest 2 with its Elite Strap accessory), a "grainy"-looking display and "fuzzy" passthrough visuals that "doesn't look remotely like the real world", and "limited and idiosyncratic" face tracking. The Workrooms app was also criticized for being unreliable, especially for software that was promoted as being one of the key selling points of the Quest Pro. Robertson gave the Quest Pro a 2 out of 5, arguing that it "[offers] technically innovative features without doing a good job of showcasing them", and suggesting that mainstream users wait for an eventual Quest 3 that may incorporate hardware improvements from the Pro at a lower price point.

=== Sales ===
In March 2023, Meta lowered the price of the Quest Pro to US$1,000, amid reports of "underwhelming" sales.

On July 19, 2023, The Information reported that Meta was in the process of discontinuing production of the Quest Pro, and had scrapped plans for a successor model. At Meta Connect in September 2024, Meta announced the discontinuation of the Quest Pro, with sales officially discontinued in January 2025, and Meta steering customers towards the Meta Quest 3 or Meta Quest 3S.

In November 2026, Meta announced that it would wind down software support for the Quest 2 and Quest Pro, with OS feature updates ending in March 2027, and being limited to maintenance and security patches until the end of 2027.
