= Andrew Bosworth =

American business executive (born 1982)

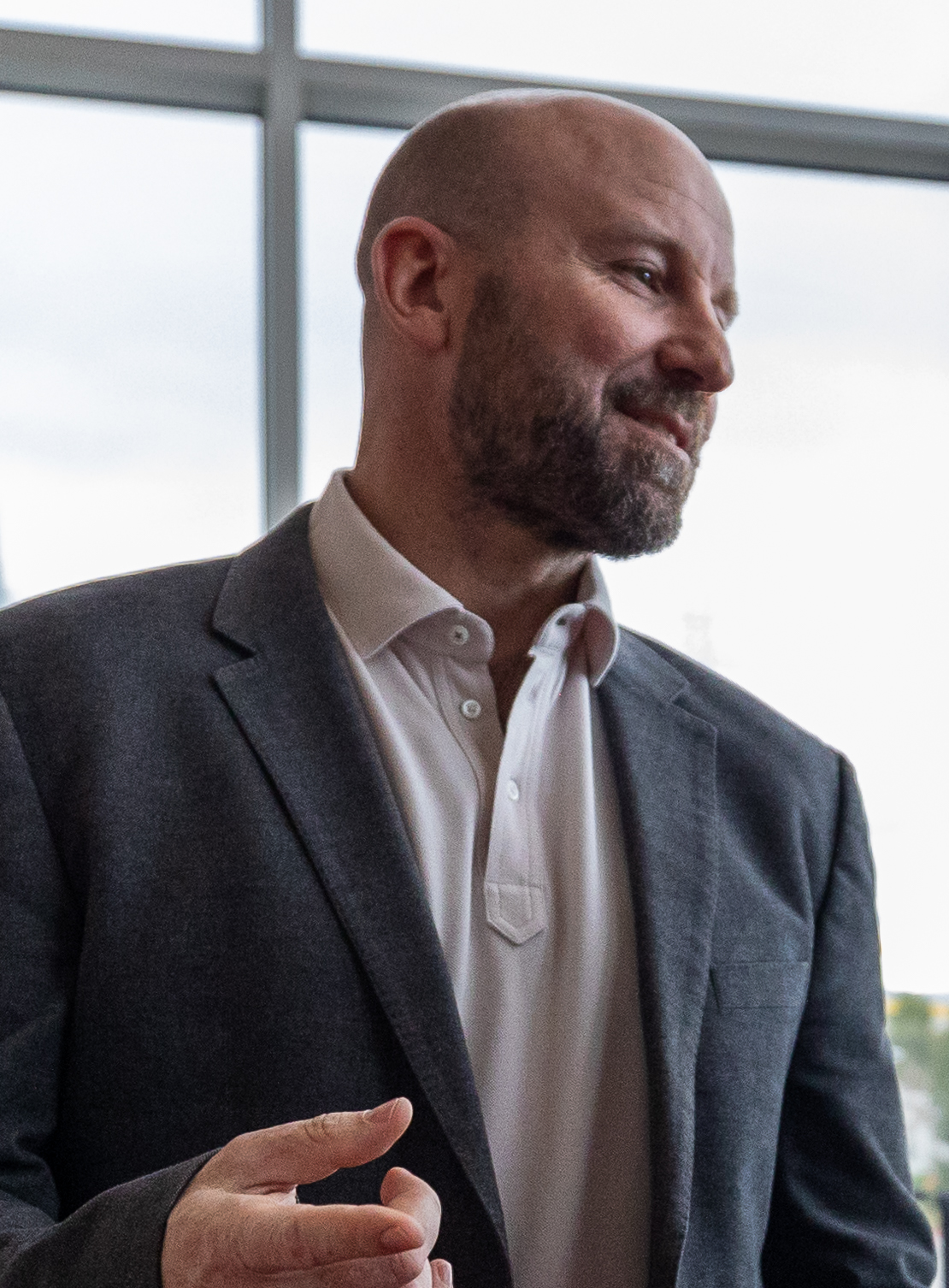
- Bosworth in 2024
- Born: January 7, 1982 (age 44); Santa Clara County, California, U.S.
- Education: Harvard University (BS)
- Occupation: Business executive
- Title: CTO of Meta Platforms
- Term: 2022–present
- Predecessor: Mike Schroepfer
- Children: 2
- Military career
- Allegiance: United States
- Branch: United States Army; U.S. Army Reserve
- Service years: 2025–present
- Rank: Lieutenant Colonel
- Unit: Detachment 201

Andrew "Boz" Bosworth (born January 7, 1982) is an American business executive and U.S. Army Reserve officer who is Meta’s chief technology officer and Head of its Reality Labs division.

After graduating from Harvard University in 2004, he worked as a developer on Microsoft Visio for almost two years, then joined Mark Zuckerberg at Facebook in January 2006, where he helped create News Feed.

In 2025, Bosworth was commissioned Lieutenant Colonel of the United States Army to advise Detachment 201.

During Bosworth's tenure as Chief Technology Officer of Meta, the company's Reality Labs division has accumulated operating losses totaling approximately $63.59 billion.

== Early life and education ==
Bosworth was born and raised in Santa Clara County, California. He grew up on a farm in Saratoga and was involved in agricultural endeavors with nonprofit 4-H as a child. Bosworth attended Harvard University and met Mark Zuckerberg while working as a teaching assistant in an artificial intelligence class. He graduated cum laude from Harvard University in 2004.

== Career ==
Bosworth began his career working for Microsoft as a developer on Microsoft Visio. In 2006, Bosworth received a call from a recruiter looking for a candidate with a background in artificial intelligence. From this, he joined as one of the first 15 engineers at Facebook and developed the Facebook News Feed, which launched later that year and was quickly replicated across the social media industry.

As Facebook’s engineering organization grew, Bosworth devised its bootcamp program for engineers joining the company and led the groups developing features including Groups, Messenger and Video Calling.

In 2012, he led the company’s transition from desktop to mobile advertising and oversaw the creation of its mobile advertising products. By 2015, these products accounted for 78% of the company’s total revenue.

Facebook CTO Mike Schroepfer announced in August 2017 that Bosworth would be transitioning to the role of vice-president for augmented reality and virtual reality, and Mark Rabkin would assume Bosworth's responsibilities. In 2020, Bosworth renamed the AR/VR organization to Reality Labs, which leads the company’s work on its metaverse vision. Reality Labs went on to launch products including the Quest VR headset, Portal video calling device, and AI glasses in partnership with EssilorLuxottica brands Ray-Ban and Oakley.

In 2021, Mark Zuckerberg announced that Bosworth would succeed Schroepfer as the company’s CTO while continuing to lead Reality Labs. Shortly after, Zuckerberg announced that Facebook would be renamed Meta to reflect the company’s focus on its metaverse vision. In 2026, Bosworth's role expanded to include oversight of the company's AI strategy, called "AI for Work."

In 2025, the U.S. Army announced that Bosworth, alongside three other senior technology executives, would join the Army Reserve to serve in the newly formed Executive Innovation Corps, known as Detachment 201. As part of the new roles, all four were sworn in as Army Reserve Lieutenants Colonel. The Army said the Corps would work on “targeted projects to help guide rapid and scalable tech solutions to complex problems.”

=== Memo controversy ===
On June 18, 2016, Bosworth wrote a memo circulated internally within Facebook titled "The Ugly", arguing that connecting people was a paramount goal for Facebook, and justified many of the company's practices. The memo also acknowledged that this could have negative consequences, such as the potential to be used by terrorist attacks coordinated via Facebook. The publication date of the memo was a day after the shooting and death of a Chicago man was recorded via Facebook Live. The memo generated strong, polarized reactions within the company. The memo was leaked to and reported on by BuzzFeed on March 29, 2018.

In a statement given to BuzzFeed after publication of the story, Facebook CEO and principal founder Mark Zuckerberg said: "Boz is a talented leader who says many provocative things. This was one that most people at Facebook including myself disagreed with strongly. We've never believed the ends justify the means. We recognize that connecting people isn't enough by itself. We also need to work to bring people closer together. We changed our whole mission and company focus to reflect this last year."

Responding to the publication of the memo by BuzzFeed, Bosworth wrote: "I don't agree with the post today and I didn't agree with it even when I wrote it. The purpose of this post, like many others I have written internally, was to bring to the surface issues I felt deserved more discussion with the broader company."

== Philanthropy ==
Bosworth is the vice chair on the board of directors for the Peninsula Open Space Trust. He is additionally recognized for his involvement in his local community and was the 2019 keynote speaker for the Burlingame/SFO Chamber of Commerce. Bosworth also participates in events as an alumnus of nonprofit 4-H, where he has previously received recognition such as the Distinguished Alumni Medallion award.

== Personal life ==
Bosworth is married to April Bosworth (née Wood). They have two children.
