= Irissometry =

Detection and tracking of the human iris

Irissometry describes the method of detection, identification, and tracking of features in the iris and its deformations as a function of changes in pupil size and eye rotation.

== Iris surface deformations ==
Studying deformations of the iris as pupil size varies is relevant to iris recognition algorithms used for personal identification.

The iris may also temporarily deform due to forces evoked during acceleration or deceleration of the eye ball. The iris deforms strongest in the pupillary region (near the pupil-iris border) where the iris is most elastic.

== Video-based iris features for eye trackers ==
The elasticity of the iris subjects the shape and degree of circularity of the pupil to variations. For example, the pupil's border may slightly wobble and alter in shape within the iris during changes in pupil size and eye-movements, which can be problematic for eye trackers which base their gaze estimation on the center mass of the pupil border. The outer, ciliary region (close to the iris-Corneal limbus border) is less elastic and thus more robust to movement forces. As such, eye-trackers may improve the accuracy of gaze tracking by relying on peripheral iris features rather than the pupillary border. An open-source MATLAB-based irissometry code is available on GitHub.

== See also ==
- Pupilometer
- Psychophysiology
