= Eckhard Hess =

German-American psychologist (1916–1986)

- Born: Eckhard Heinrich Hess; 27 September 1916; Bochum, Germany
- Died: 23 February 1986 (aged 69); Cambridge, Maryland, United States
- Citizenship: United States
- Education: Johns Hopkins University
- Known for: Pupillometry
- Scientific career
- Fields: Ethology; Psychology
- Institutions: University of Chicago
- Thesis: The development of the chick's responses to light-and-shade cues of depth (1948)

Eckhard Heinrich Hess (27 September 1916 – 21 February 1986) was a German-born American psychologist and ethologist, known for his research on pupillometry and animal imprinting. He joined the Department of Psychology at the University of Chicago as an instructor in 1948. He became a full professor in the Department of Psychology in 1959, and served as its chairman from 1963 to 1968. Hess pioneered the study of animal behavior from an ethological/evolutionary perspective at a time when Skinner's behaviorism was the dominant paradigm of animal behavior study in the United States.
