= LING VR =

LING VR (灵镜) is a line of virtual reality headsets founded in 2014 by Beijing VR-TIME Technology Co., Ltd. There are currently two product lines under LING VR: BAI series and HEI. BAI is a virtual reality headset that is structurally similar to Google Cardboard and Samsung Gear VR – using a smart phone as the display – plus a Bluetooth controller to perform complex input. HEI is an all-in-one wireless headset that positioning in experiencing high quality VR worlds and games.

== Hardware ==
=== BAI ===
BAI is a VR display device achieved by smart phone mounted inside. The first publication of BAI is in May 2015 while the product raising funds in Taobao crowd funding platform.

Brand: BAI
Model: MK1
Color: black&white
Visual effect: immersion type [FOV 90 degrees]

=== BAI 1S ===
In July 2015, LING VR published its upgrade generation of BAI: LING BAI 1S. It kept original concept of design and made essential upgrade based on customer feedback. 1. Anti-fogging 2. Three-way interpupillary distance adjust 3. Improved pulley damping for myopia adaption 4. Enhanced headband buckle 5. White piano baking paint panel

Brand: BAI 1S
Model: MK1s
Color: white
Visual effect: immersion type [FOV 90 degrees]

=== LING Controller ===
LING Controller is produced based on Bluetooth protocol 3.0. LING handler is used in collocation with BAI and BAI 1S.
Main function: achieve multi-dimensional control of games and Ling Cinema.

Keys: A, B, Return, Menu, Joystick, Volume.

Protocol: Bluetooth 3.0

Battery: AAA battery*2

=== HEI ===
HEI is an all-in-one virtual reality headset with its own processor, display and controller. HEI is expected to be released by the end of 2015 by official disclosure.

CPU: Allwinner A80, Magny-Cours, 2 GHz

GPU: PowerVR G6230 600 MHz

Memory: 4 GB DDR3/LPDDR3

Storage: 32 GB

== Software ==
=== Ling World ===
Ling World is a virtual reality resource app store. It is currently designed for none-VR system use and only supports for Android system. [7] Ling World integrates a lot of VR game and software resources with download and management function. It is deeply bounded with LING Cinema.

=== LING Cinema ===
LING Cinema is a panoramic virtual reality media player, developed based on Android. Smart phone GPU installing LING Cinema should support OpenGL ES 2.0. LING Cinema is the first fully immersive VR media player that occurred in mainland China. Users can place oneself in the gate of the cinema to choose a local or online film. The Cinema supports three different play styles: home theater / IMAX / free view, allowing users to have a different viewing experience.
Notice: the interaction in LING Cinema is controlled by head, aiming target with the crosshair in center of your view and presses A button on Bluetooth handler to confirm.

=== LING OS ===
LING OS is a set of SDK built by LING, which is derived from the open source Android system, supporting to build up virtual reality applications on Android platform.
