= Pupillary response =

Physiological response that varies the size of the pupil

Dilation and constriction of the pupil

Pupillary response is a physiological response that varies the size of the pupil between 1.5 mm and 8 mm, via the optic and oculomotor cranial nerve.

A constriction response (miosis), is the narrowing of the pupil, which may be caused by scleral buckles or drugs such as opiates/opioids or anti-hypertension medications. Constriction of the pupil occurs when the circular muscle, controlled by the parasympathetic nervous system (PSNS), contracts, and also to an extent when the radial muscle relaxes.

A dilation response (mydriasis), is the widening of the pupil and may be caused by adrenaline; anticholinergic agents; stimulant drugs such as MDMA, cocaine, and amphetamines; and some hallucinogenics (e.g. LSD). Dilation of the pupil occurs when the smooth cells of the radial muscle, controlled by the sympathetic nervous system (SNS), contract, and also when the cells of the iris sphincter muscle relax.

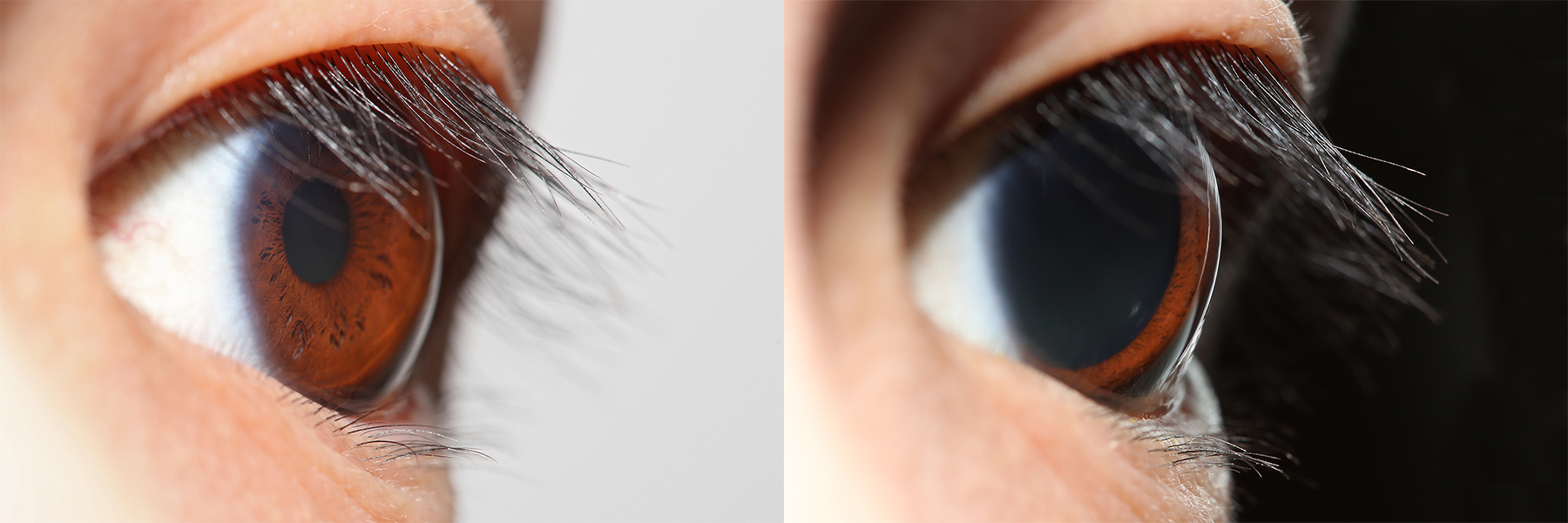
Constricted (left) and dilated (right) pupil of the same eye

The responses can have a variety of causes, from an involuntary reflex reaction to exposure or inexposure to light—in low light conditions a dilated pupil lets more light into the eye—or it may indicate interest in the subject of attention or arousal, sexual stimulation, uncertainty, information content, decision conflict, errors, physical activity or increasing cognitive load or cognitive demand. These relationships are investigated in the context of task-invoked pupillary response. The responses correlate strongly with activity in the locus coeruleus neurotransmitter system. The pupils contract immediately before REM sleep begins. A pupillary response can be intentionally conditioned as a Pavlovian response to some stimuli.

Some humans have the ability to exert direct and voluntary control over their iris sphincter muscles and dilator muscles, granting them the ability to dilate and constrict their pupils on command, regardless of lighting condition and/or eye accommodation state. However, this ability is very rare, and its potential use or advantages are unclear.

The latency of pupillary response (the time in which it takes to occur) increases with age.

In ophthalmology, intensive studies of pupillary response are conducted via videopupillometry.

Anisocoria is the condition of one pupil being more dilated than the other.

Scheme showing sympathetic and parasympathetic innervation of the pupil and sites of lesion in a Horner's syndrome

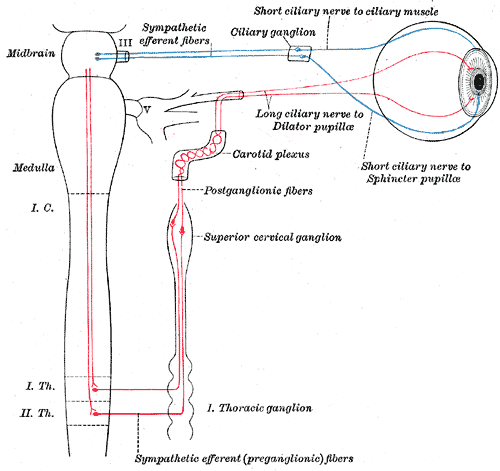
Sympathetic connections of the ciliary and superior cervical ganglia

Pupillary responses
	Constriction (Parasympathetic)	Dilation (Sympathetic)
Muscular mechanism	Relaxation of iris dilator muscle, activation of iris sphincter muscle	Activation of iris dilator muscle, relaxation of iris sphincter muscle
Cause in pupillary light reflex	Increased light	Decreased light
Other physiological causes	Accommodation reflex	Fight-or-flight response, sexual arousal
Corresponding non-physiological state	Miosis	Mydriasis

== See also ==
- Cycloplegia
- Dilated fundus examination
- Iris sphincter muscle
- Pupillary light reflex
- Pupillary reflex
- Pupillometry
- Pupilometer
- Task-invoked pupillary response
