= Neurological pupil index =

Medical assessment scale

Clinicians routinely check the pupils of critically injured and ill patients to monitor neurological status. However, manual pupil measurements (performed using a penlight or ophthalmoscope) have been shown to be subjective, inaccurate, and not repeatable or consistent. Automated assessment of the pupillary light reflex has emerged as an objective means of measuring pupillary reactivity across a range of neurological diseases, including stroke, traumatic brain injury and edema, tumoral herniation syndromes, and sports or war injuries. Automated pupillometers are used to assess an array of objective pupillary variables including size, constriction velocity, latency, and dilation velocity, which are normalized and standardized to compute an indexed score such as the Neurological Pupil index (NPi) or the Quantitative Pupillometry index (QPi).

== Pupillary evaluation ==
Pupillary evaluation involves the assessment of two components—pupil size and reactivity to light.

- Pupil size is traditionally measured using a pupil gauge to estimate the diameter in millimeters of the pupil at rest before any light is shone into the eye—pupils should be of similar size. Manual measurement is subjective and prone to error.
- Pupil light reactivity is evaluated by shining a light into a patient's eye to make the pupil constrict in reaction to the light. The pupil should dilate again when the light is moved away. The pupil's reaction is numerically graded, typically on scales from one to three, to translate how brisk the pupillary reflex is. These terms are subjective and applied without a standard clinical protocol or definition.

== Neurological Pupil index (NPi) ==
The Neurological Pupil index, or NPi, is an algorithm developed by NeurOptics, Inc., that removes subjectivity from the pupillary evaluation. A patient's pupil measurement (including variables such as size, latency, constriction velocity, dilation velocity, etc.) is obtained using a pupillometer, and the measurement is compared against a normative model of pupil reaction to light and automatically graded by the NPi on a scale of 0 to 4.9. Pupil reactivity is express numerically so that changes in both pupil size and reactivity can be trended over time, just like other vital signs.

The numeric scale of the NPi allows for a more rigorous interpretation and classification of the pupil response than subjective assessment.

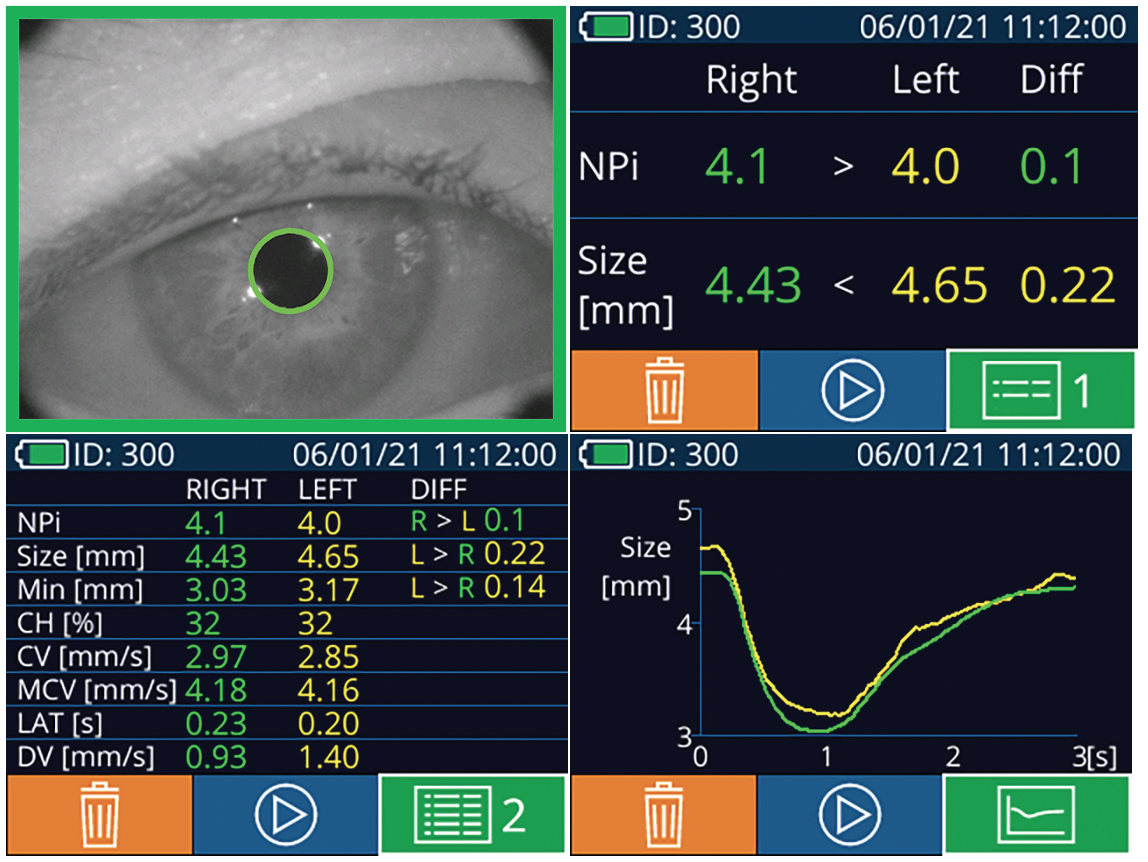
Neurological Pupil index™ (NPi®) Pupil Reactivity Assessment Scale (NeurOptics, Inc.)

== Interpreting the Neurological Pupillary index (NPi) ==
Each NPi measurement taken is rated on a scale ranging from 0 to 4.9. A score equal to or above 3 means that the pupil measurement falls within the boundaries of normal pupil behavior as defined by the NPi. However, a value closer to 4.9 is more normal data than a value closer to 3. An NPi score below 3 means the reflex is abnormal, i.e., weaker than a normal pupil response, and values closer to 0 are more abnormal than values closer to 3. A difference in NPi between Right and Left pupils of greater than or equal to 0.7 may also be considered an abnormal pupil reading.

== Validity of score indices in pupillometry ==
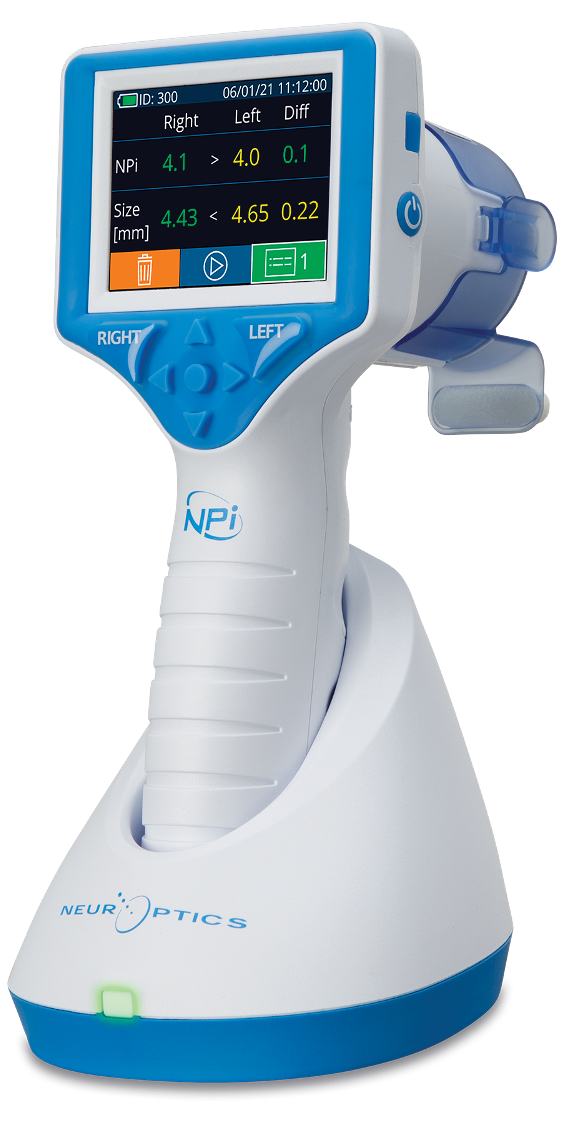
Automated pupillometer (NPi-300 by NeurOptics, Inc.)

More than 100 studies published in peer-reviewed academic journals indicate the effectiveness of automated pupillometry and the NPi scale for use in critical care medicine, neurology, neurosurgery, emergency medicine, and applied research settings.

- According to the new American Heart Association (AHA) guidelines, most deaths attributable to post-cardiac arrest brain injury are due to active withdrawal of life-sustaining treatment based on a predicted poor neurological outcome. The NPi and automated pupillometry have recently been included in the updated 2020 American Heart Association (AHA) Guidelines for Cardiopulmonary Resuscitation (CPR) and Emergency Cardiovascular Care (ECC) as an object measurement supporting brain injury prognosis in patients following cardiac arrest.
- Clinical Neurology and Neurosurgery published a study that found that intracerebral hemorrhage volume and shift of midline structures correlate with NPi, and abnormalities in NPi can be predicted by hematoma volume and other CT indicators of ICH severity.
- A case study series published in the Journal of Neuroscience of Nursing revealed that automated infrared pupillometry is an accurate tool that provides reliable data in patients with a poor baseline neurological examination after stroke.
- A study published in Neurocritical Care found that automated pupillometry is more reliable than standard clinical assessments in detecting and tracking subtle changes in cerebral edema and pupillary reactivity during osmotic therapy.
- Data published in the Journal of Neuroscience Nursing demonstrated significant differences in pupillary values for NPi, latency, and constriction velocity when stratified by age, sex, or severity of illness defined by the Glasgow Coma Scale score. The study provided a greater understanding of expected distributions for automated pupillometry values in a wide range of neurocritical care populations.
- Another study in Neurocritical Care found that abnormal NPi and pupillary light reflex measurements by pupillometer are predictive of poor outcomes very early after resuscitation from cardiac arrest, and are not usually associated with dilated pupils.
- Critical Care published a study examining the relationship between the NPi and invasive intracranial pressure (ICP) in 54 patients with severe traumatic brain injury (TBI). The study found that episodes of sustained elevated ICP were associated with a concomitant decrease in NPi in subjects with intracranial hypertension.
- Data published in the Journal of Stroke and Cerebrovascular Diseases demonstrated that in patients with ischemic and hemorrhagic strokes, there is a significant correlation between the suptum pellucidum (SPS) and the NPi, but not with pupil size. The authors concluded NPi assessment by automated pupillometry could be considered a useful surrogate to non-invasively monitor midline shift in stroke patients, and help in the utilization of imaging and assessing the need for intervention.
- A study published in the Journal of Neurosurgery found that the NPi may signal an early warning of potential delayed cerebral ischemia and enable preemptive escalation of care.
- A case report published in Brain Injury presented a patient who was "saved" by the use of NPi as part of his clinical assessment. Based on manual light assessment of the pupils, it was determined that the patient had suffered irreversible demise from an acute traumatic subdural hematoma. However, a subsequent assessment using an automated pupillometer with NPi showed that his pupils were in fact reactive—he then made a good recovery following treatment.
- Intensive Care Medicine published a study that found quantitative NPi had excellent ability to predict an unfavorable outcome from day one after cardiac arrest, with no false positives, and significantly higher specificity than standard manual pupillary examination.
- Four studies published in the Journal of Neuroscience Nursing concluded that automated pupillometry, using the NPi, enhanced clinical decision-making and added value to patient care in neuroscience/neurotrauma intensive care settings. One study showed that the integration of routine pupillometer assessments improves the accuracy of examinations and correlates with intracranial pressure values. Another study concluded that automated pupillometry represents an alternative to manual pupillary assessment, which may have greater interrater agreement and reliability.
- The American Journal of Critical Care revealed that critical care and neurosurgical nurses consistently underestimated pupil size, were unable to identify anisocoria (unequal pupil size), and incorrectly assessed pupil reactivity. The study concluded that automated pupillometry is a necessary tool for accuracy and consistency, and may facilitate earlier detection of subtle pupil changes, allowing for more effective and timely diagnostic and treatment interventions.
- It has been shown that quantitative NPi can predict a poor outcome in patients with cardiac arrest from day 1 after VA-ECMO insertion, with no false positives. Combining NPi and 12-h PREDICT-VA ECMO score increased the sensitivity of outcome prediction, while maintaining 100% specificity.
- Researchers also concluded that the use of NPi provides important supplementary diagnostic, therapeutic, and prognostic information to guide the management of nonconvulsive status epilepticus and severe TBI patients.
- Additional studies published in peer-reviewed journals continue to demonstrate the effectiveness of NeurOptics' NPi in helping clinicians improve patient outcomes.

Others:

- A study published in Vision Development & Rehabilitation demonstrates the effectiveness of automated pupillometry using Reflex, an iOS based pupillometer that does not require capital equipment.

== Clinical equivalence between NPi and QPi indexes ==
Several clinical publications have demonstrated the clinical equivalence of the QPi (Quantitative Pupillary Index) and NPi (Neurological Pupillary Index) in critical care settings. These indices have been studied in various contexts, including the assessment of comatose patients following cardiac arrest (CA) and the evaluation of traumatic brain injury (TBI).

The first abstract, titled "Comparison between Neurological Pupil Index and Quantitative Pupillometry Index to prognosticate outcome after cardiac arrest", by Pasetto et al., investigated the prognostic accuracy of QPi and NPi in predicting unfavorable neurological outcomes after CA. This prospective observational study revealed significant correlations between QPi and NPi values. The study concluded that both indices are interchangeable for assessing neurological outcomes in CA patients, further supporting their reliability in clinical practice.

A second abstract, "Equivalence between Quantitative Pupillary Index (QPi) and Neurological Pupil Index (NPi) in Critical Care Settings", by Blandino Ortiz et al., also highlighted the equivalence of the two indices across diverse neurocritical applications. This study demonstrated that QPi and NPi provide strongly correlated results when used to monitor pupillary reactivity, reinforcing their role as reliable tools for early decision-making in neurocritical care.

A third abstract, "Quantitative Pupillometry Index (QPi) in Comatose Patients After Cardiac Arrest", by Zorzi et al., expanded on these findings by evaluating the QPi and NPi in a larger cohort of 98 patients across two centers. This study showed strong correlations between the indices over multiple time points (e.g., Ps = 0.70 at 24 hours, Ps = 0.68 at 72 hours, p < 0.001). A QPi ≤ 2 at 72 hours demonstrated a specificity of 100% for predicting UO, further underscoring its prognostic value. The authors concluded that QPi and NPi are strongly correlated and can be interchangeably used for prognosticating neurological outcomes in comatose patients after CA.

Together, these studies reinforce the equivalence and utility of QPi and NPi as interchangeable tools in critical care, particularly for monitoring pupillary reactivity and predicting neurological outcomes in patients with acute brain injuries or post-cardiac arrest comas.

== See also ==
- Pupilometer
- Pupillometry
