= Pupillary reflex =

Pupillary reflex refers to one of the reflexes associated with pupillary function.

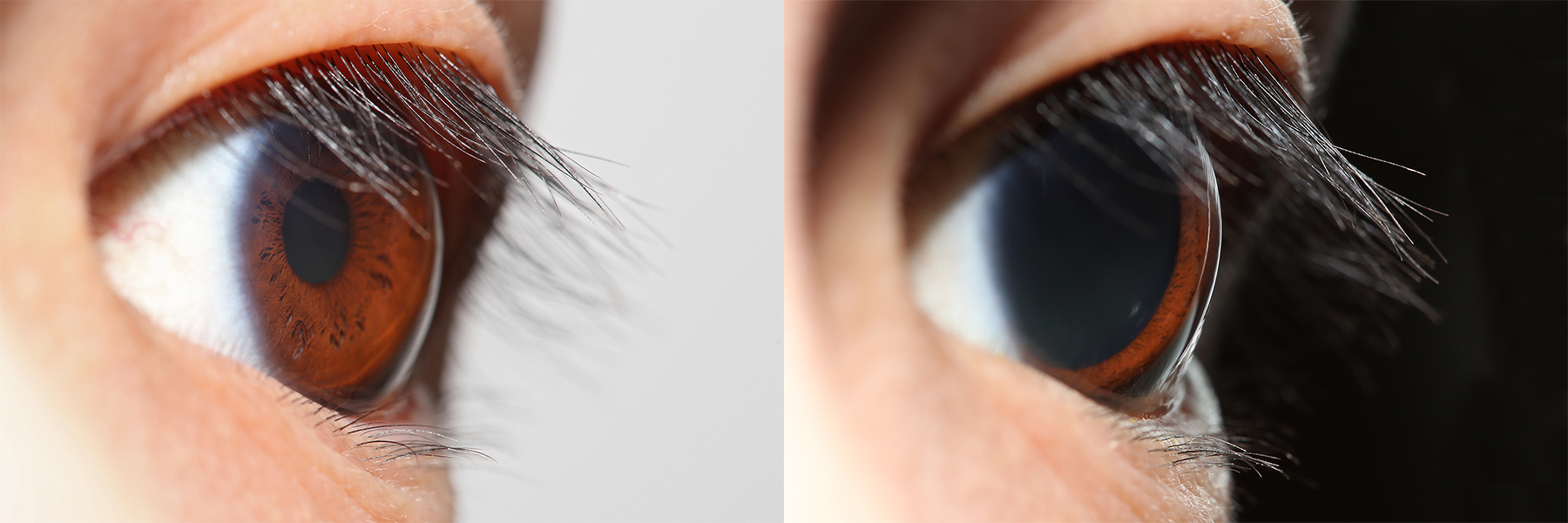
The pupillary reflex results in the pupil constricting (left) and dilating (right)

These include the pupillary light reflex and accommodation reflex. Although the pupillary response, in which the pupil dilates or constricts due to light is not usually called a "reflex", it is still usually considered a part of this topic. Adjustment to close-range vision is known as "the near response", while relaxation of the ciliary muscle to view distant objects is known as the "far response".

In "the near response" there are three processes that occur to focus an image on the retina. Convergence of the eyes, or the orientation of the visual axis of each eye towards an object in order to focus its image on each fovea, is the first of the three responses. This can be observed by the cross-eyed movement of the eyes when a finger is held up in front of a face and moved towards the face. Next, constriction of the pupil occurs. Because the lens cannot refract light rays at the edges well, the image produced by the lens is blurry around the edges so the pupil constricts when one attempts to focus on nearby objects. Lastly, accommodation of the lens occurs. This is an alteration in the curvature of the lens that allows focus on a nearby object.

The pupillary reflex can be controlled with drugs, including photoswitchable derivatives of clonidine that behave as adrenergic agonists (adrenoswitches) and can be applied topically in the cornea of mice.
