= Task-invoked pupillary response =

Pupilliary dilation from cognitive effort

Pupillary response

Task-invoked pupillary response (also known as "Task-Evoked pupillary response") is a pupillary response observed after an increase in cognitive load in humans, as a result of the subsequent decrease in parasympathetic activity in the peripheral nervous system. As a task places increased demand on working memory, pupil dilation has been observed to increase linearly. Jackson Beatty evaluated task-invoked pupillary response in different tasks for short-term memory, language processing, reasoning, perception, sustained attention, and selective attention, and found that this reaction fulfills Daniel Kahneman's three criteria for indicating processing load. That is, it can reflect differences in processing load within a task, between different tasks, and across individuals. It is used as an indicator of cognitive load in psychophysiology research.

== History ==
Hundreds of years ago, it was said that merchants could read into their customers' thoughts and intentions by watching changes in the diameter of their customers' pupils.

== Biological background ==
Pupil size is controlled by the iris dilator muscle, which dilates the pupil, and the iris sphincter muscle, which contracts the pupil. These are affected by the sympathetic and parasympathetic nervous systems, respectively.

Older research suggests this pupillary response is most likely a result of the reticular activating system of the brainstem being linked to the cerebral cortex. The regulation of some functions of the eye, including dilation, is directly affected by the reticular system. Parts of this system are linked to higher nervous structures that are directly involved in cognition task-related activities, as well as the activation of the cortex. These nervous structures include the:

- thalamus
- caudate body
- archicortex
- neocortex

As such, cognitive load can have a direct effect on some functions of the reticular system, like the dilation of the eye, and cause task-evoked pupillary response.

More modern work finds that the pupillary response is associated with the locus coeruleus-norepinephrine (LC-NE) system, and the recent research uses pupil dilations as a biomarker of the LC-NE system activity. The LC-NE system is linked to areas of the brain related to the detection, cognition and attention of task demands. It is also very likely that the reason the LC is linked to pupillary activity is due to the shared interactions with the gigantocellularis nucleus of the ventral medulla. However, a large range of neural systems influences pupil dilation. One such system is the basal forebrain-acetylcholine (ACh) pathway. Similar to the locus-coeruleus, the basal forebrain projects widely across the brain.

== Experimental findings ==
=== Short-term memory ===
Beatty and Kahneman (1966) asked participants of an experiment to remember a sequence of digits at a rate of one per second. A pause of 2 seconds followed, and then the participants were asked to repeat the digits at the same rate. They found that pupillary diameter increased with each digit the participants heard and then decreased as they repeated the digits back in order. The maximum size depended on how many digits were to be remembered and repeated. As such, the extent of dilation is directly related to the level of difficulty of the task, thus the amount of cognitive load, or "mental effort" that was experienced by participants. For this reason, task-evoked pupillary response has the potential to be used as a measure of cognitive load.

=== Diagnosticity ===
Task-evoked pupillary response is not diagnostic when the cognitive load is related to task performance. This is because the pupillary response is the same for a large array of activities that require mental effort, including perceptual, cognitive and response-related tasks. Instead, task-evoked pupillary response can be observed as a measure of cognitive load. However, task-evoked pupillary response appears to be diagnostic when it comes to data-limited processing. For example, if presented with changes to weak auditory stimuli, the pupil will not demonstrate any changes in diameter but will instead be affected by changes to experimental conditions.

=== Task performance ===
A study by van der Wel suggests that pupillary dilation due to task-evoked pupillary response is associated with greater task performance. In one experiment involving the n-back task, a correlation was observed between those with higher dilation, due to pupillary response, and improved performance.

The study also suggested that pupil diameter changes may correlate with metrics of intelligence during focus (and, as a measure of effort required), and higher intelligence was associated with a reduced increase in diameter during an arithmetic task. However, tests targeting fluid intelligence associated higher levels of fluid intelligence with greater pupil dilation in difficult analogical tasks, suggesting variation between different types of tasks.

Other studies showed an opposite relationship, with higher pupillary dilation associated with lower performance in certain tasks. In a study using the Stroop test, higher pupil dilation positively correlated with a stronger Stroop effect (a slower reaction time). Researchers suggested that those who performed poorer with incongruent matching required more processing effort than those with higher cognitive flexibility. However, the same correlation could be explained through a potential reduction in difficulty of accessing information in those with better inhibitory control.

==== Expertise ====
A study among physicians and trainees showed that experts experienced a smaller task-evoked pupillary response than novices, due to a lower cognitive load. This is suggested to be because experts are able to access knowledge more easily.

=== Surprise and sequential processing ===
Sensory information exhibits statistical regularities that humans continuously learn. When these expectations are violated, such as in an oddball paradigm where a deviant stimulus occurs among standards, our perceptual system detects the discrepancy, and the brain responses are generated (mismatch negativity and P300) along with pupil dilations.

More complex violations, such as transitions between structured and random sequences, elicit pupil responses that scale with the informational change or surprise in the environment. Larger dilations occur for transitions from predictable to unpredictable contexts, highlighting that pupil dynamics reflect not only minor sensory deviations but also the statistical structure of the environment.

=== Negative results ===
Wierwille and colleagues found that task-evoked pupillary response provided negative results when pilots were asked to run a flight simulator while solving navigational problems. However, it is argued that during this experiment, the pupil size was recorded 3 seconds after the visual stimulus of the flight simulator display was presented. Since the pupillary response is very rapid, it may be the case that the response has finished by the time the pupil size was measured.

== Reliability ==
Some external variables, such as light and near reflexes, may cause variance to the task-evoked pupillary response. It is for this reason that Kramer argues that the use of this pupillary response as a scientific measure of cognitive load should be kept to the laboratory, and not for use in the field. This is shown further by Hess, who found that when participants move their view across a non-uniform field, such as a photograph, the task-evoked pupillary response may be affected.

== See also ==
- Pupil
- Pupillometry
- Psychophysiology
