= Pupillometry =

Measurement of pupil size and reactivity

Pupillometry, the measurement of pupil size and reactivity, is a key part of the clinical neurological exam for patients with a wide variety of neurological injuries. It is also used in psychology.

== Pupillometry in critical care ==
For more than 100 years, clinicians have evaluated the pupils of patients with suspected or known brain injury or impaired consciousness to monitor neurological status and trends, checking for pupil size and reactivity to light. In fact, before the advent of electricity, doctors checked a patient's reaction to light using a candle.

Today, clinicians routinely evaluate pupils as a component of the neurological examination and monitoring of critically ill patients, including patients with traumatic brain injury and stroke. In 2016, Couret et al. showed that "Standard practice in pupillary monitoring yields inaccurate data that Automated quantitative pupillometry is a more reliable method with which to collect pupillary measurements at the bedside. In 2019, the first smartphone based pupillometer was released as an accurate and economical way to determine pupil size and dynamic response objectively. However, another study has shown the necessary use of an opaque eyecup as pupillary light reflex is affected by ambient light. It is important to mention that certain pupillometers and all smartphones do not have this particular feature.

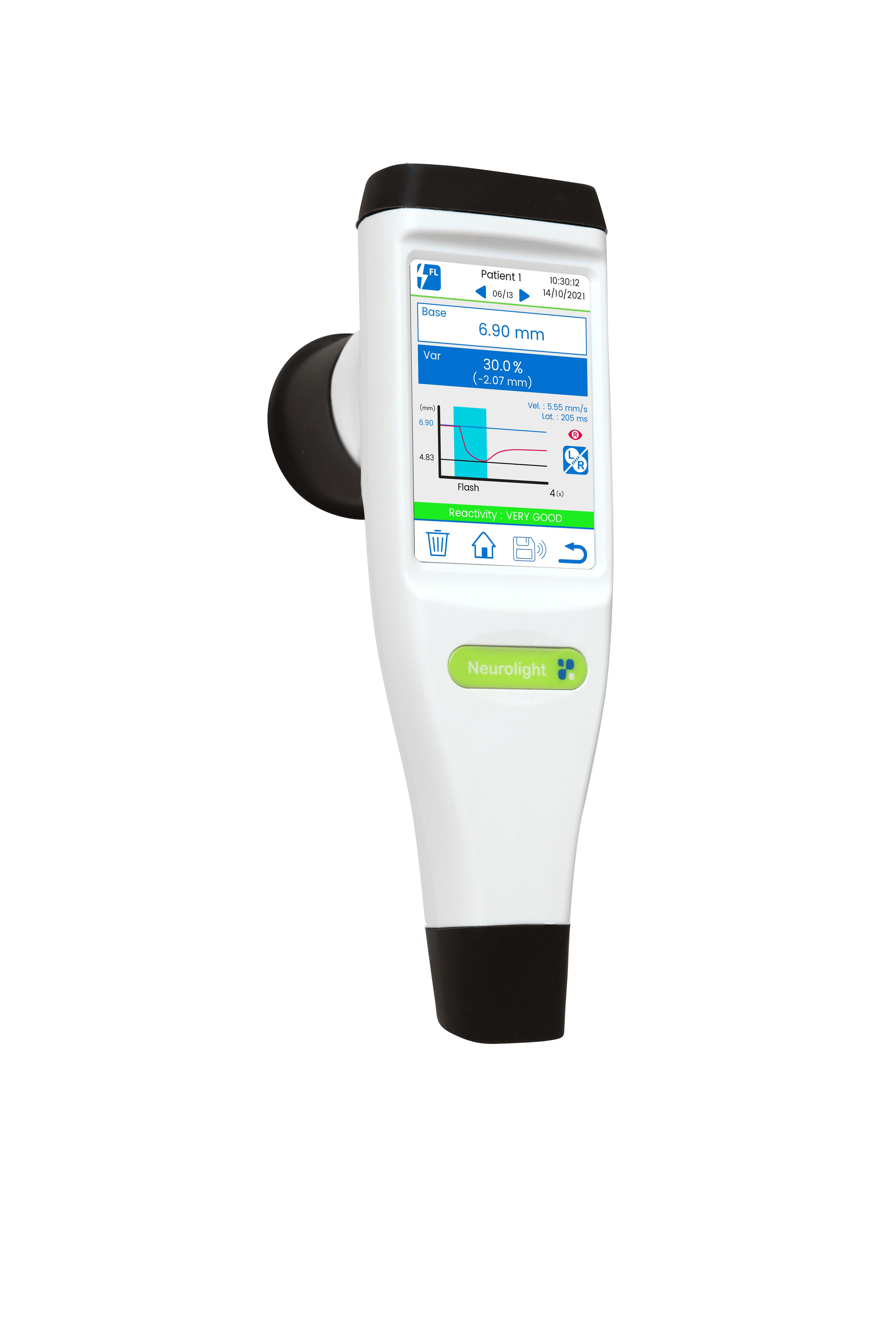
NeuroLight pupillometer and its QPi score (IDMed, Inc)

=== Patient care and outcome ===
Numerous studies have shown the importance of pupil evaluation in the clinical setting, and pupillary information is used extensively in patient management and as an indication for possible medical intervention.

Patients who undergo prompt intervention after a new finding of pupil abnormality have a better chance of recovery.

Alterations of the pupil light reflex, size of the pupil, and anisocoria (unequal pupils) are correlated with outcomes of patients with traumatic brain injury. Blood flow imaging has shown that pupil changes are highly correlated with brainstem oxygenation and perfusion, and anisocoria can be an indicator of a pathological process or neurological dysfunction.

Investigators have used pupil size and reactivity as fundamental parameters of outcome predictive models in conjunction with other clinical information such as age, mechanism of injury, and Glasgow Coma Scale, and have correlated the models with the presence and location of intracranial mass lesions.

The National Institutes of Health Stroke Scale (NIHSS) uses pupillary response as a systematic assessment tool to provide a quantitative measure of stroke-related neurologic deficit and to evaluate acuity of stroke patients, determine appropriate treatment, and predict patient outcome.

=== Manual vs. automated pupil assessment ===
Traditionally, pupil measurements have been performed in a subjective manner by using a penlight or flashlight to manually evaluate pupil reactivity (sPLR, "s" stands for standard) and using a pupil gauge to estimate pupil size. However, manual pupillary assessment is subject to significant inaccuracies and inconsistencies. Studies have shown inter-examiner disagreement in the manual evaluation of pupillary reaction to be as high as 39 percent. Automated pupillometry involves the use of a pupillometer, a portable, handheld device that provides a reliable and objective measurement of pupillary size, symmetry, and reactivity through measurement of the pupil light reflex (qPLR). sPLR is opposed to quantitative PLR (qPLR) that is provided by an automated pupillometer. qPLR corresponds to the percentage of pupillary constriction to a calibrated light stimulus. Pupillometers before 2018 predominately used infrared cameras to observe pupil diameter. Then, in 2019, advancements in machine learning have enabled visual spectrum pupillometry using a smartphone. When measuring the pupillary light reflex, it's important to use an opaque eyecup to get accurate results. This is because the measurement can be affected by ambient light. It's worth noting that some devices, such as smartphones and certain pupillometers, lack this ability. Therefore, using an eyecup is even more necessary. Overall, using an eyecup helps ensure precise measurements of the pupillary light reflex. Numeric scales allow for a more rigorous interpretation and classification of the pupil response and are a primary feature of both hardware and software based pupillometers.

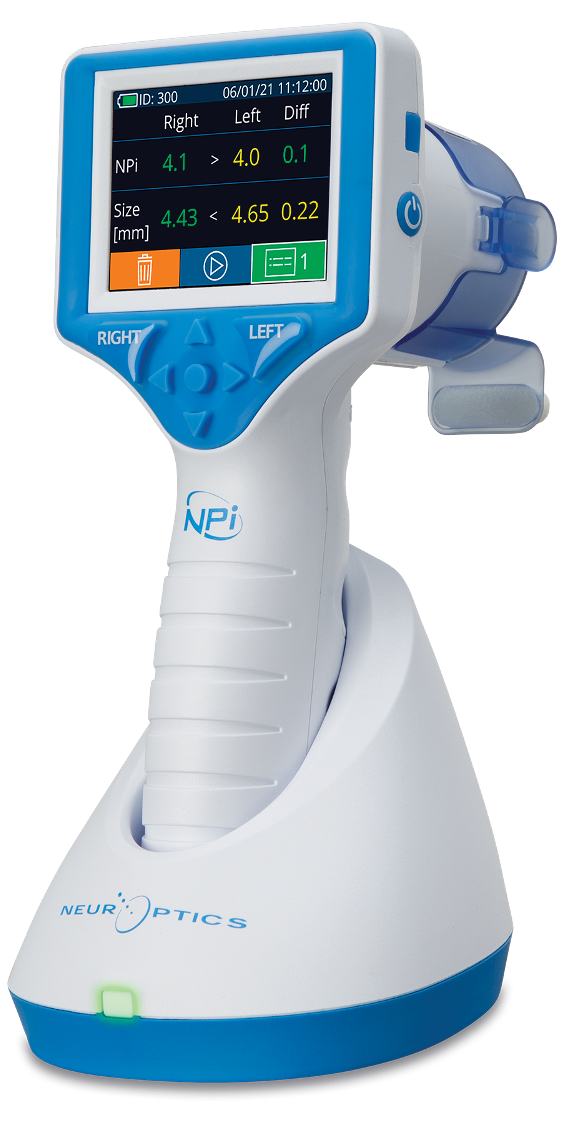
NPi-300 automated infrared pupillometer (NeurOptics, Inc.)

Automated pupillometry removes subjectivity from the pupillary evaluation, providing more accurate and trendable pupil data, and allowing earlier detection of changes for more timely patient treatment. By using automated pupillometers and algorithms such as NPi (Neurological Pupil index), QPi score (Quantitative Pupillometry Index), PuRe score, (Pupil Reactivity Score), or Reflex's "Reflex Score", doctors can easily and objectively assess pupil reactivity that could otherwise be missed by manual assessment. Automated pupillometers have been proven to be more effective than manual pupil assessment.

With an automated pupillometer, the Neurological Pupil index (NPi), Quantitative Pupillometry Index (QPi), or Pupil Reactivity Score (PuRe) can quantify pupil reactivity. These scores provide objective data and can detect subtle changes that might not be apparent to the naked eye. Its quantitative nature provides objective and more reliable assessment. Moreover, it is color-coded for a quick clinical interpretation. It displays through a qualitative scale a quantitative interval for each color associated with its number.

Mobile visual spectrum automated pupillometers have been proven effective as an alternative to infrared pupillometers that typically command a higher cost. Controversy has risen around infrared pupillometers as some of them are routinely incapable of measuring hippus, a natural pupillary phenomenon, which has professionals concluding that NeurOptics' devices fit a curve to measured data. The NeuroLight pupillometer (IDMED), on the other hand, provides this pupillary unrest in ambient light (PUAL) function, which is described as a consistent indicator of opioid effect and is the gold standard in this field of research. Infrared pupillometers use an eye guard that is placed on a subject's orbit or zygomatic bone and uses a fixed distance calibration to determine pupil size which has further brought into question the validity of fixed distance measures as the human population varies widely in skull structure. The NeuroLight and NPi pupillometers are both devices for measuring pupils but differ significantly in terms of ergonomics and functionality. The main distinction lies in the NPi's use of a transparent eye guard that contains an electronic component for patient identification and results recording, making it unique to each patient. NeurOptics' NPi Pupillometers are used in over 800 hospitals in the United States, distributed to over 40 countries worldwide and have been studied in over 130 clinical publications. NeuroLight, in contrast, comes with a touchscreen display and employs a reusable opaque eyecup that isolates the eye from ambient light. This design feature not only enhances the accuracy of the pupillary measurements but also reduces the overall cost of usage to the initial purchase of the device.

According to the new American Heart Association guidelines, most deaths attributable to post-cardiac arrest brain injury are due to active withdrawal of life-sustaining treatment based on a predicted poor neurological outcome. The NPi and automated pupillometry have recently been included in the updated 2020 American Heart Association (AHA) Guidelines for Cardiopulmonary Resuscitation (CPR) and Emergency Cardiovascular Care (ECC) as an object measurement supporting brain injury prognosis in patients following cardiac arrest.

A study published in the Journal of Neurosurgery found that automated pupillometers may signal an early warning of potential delayed cerebral ischemia and enable preemptive escalation of care.

The American Journal of Critical Care revealed that critical care and neurosurgical nurses consistently underestimated pupil size, were unable to identify anisocoria, and incorrectly assessed pupil reactivity (sPLR). It concluded that automated pupillometry is a necessary tool for accuracy and consistency, and that it might facilitate earlier detection of subtle pupil changes, allowing more effective and timely diagnostic and treatment interventions.

In addition, a study from The University of Texas Southwestern Medical Center compared 2,329 manual pupillary exams performed simultaneously by two examiners (neurology and neurosurgery attending and resident physicians, staff nurses, and mid-level practitioners) under identical conditions and showed low inter-examiner reliability. The American Association of Critical-Care Nurses (AACN) Procedure Manual for High Acuity, Progressive and Critical Care, 7th Edition, and the American Association of Neuroscience Nurses (AANN) Core Curriculum for Neuroscience Nursing, 6th Edition, now include sections illustrating how use of a pupillometer removes subjectivity and allows pupillary reactivity to be trended in a consistent, objective, and quantifiable way. The AACN Procedure Manual, which was extensively reviewed by more than 100 experts in critical care nursing, is the authoritative reference for procedures performed in critical care settings, and the AANN curriculum is a comprehensive resource for practicing neuroscience nurses.

Advancements in mobile-based automated pupillometry have been made in recent years to accommodate for the growing number of mobile phones being used in healthcare. Notably, Brightlamp, Inc. has secured the first intellectual property relating to mobile quantitative pupillometry.

=== Software vs. hardware pupillometers ===
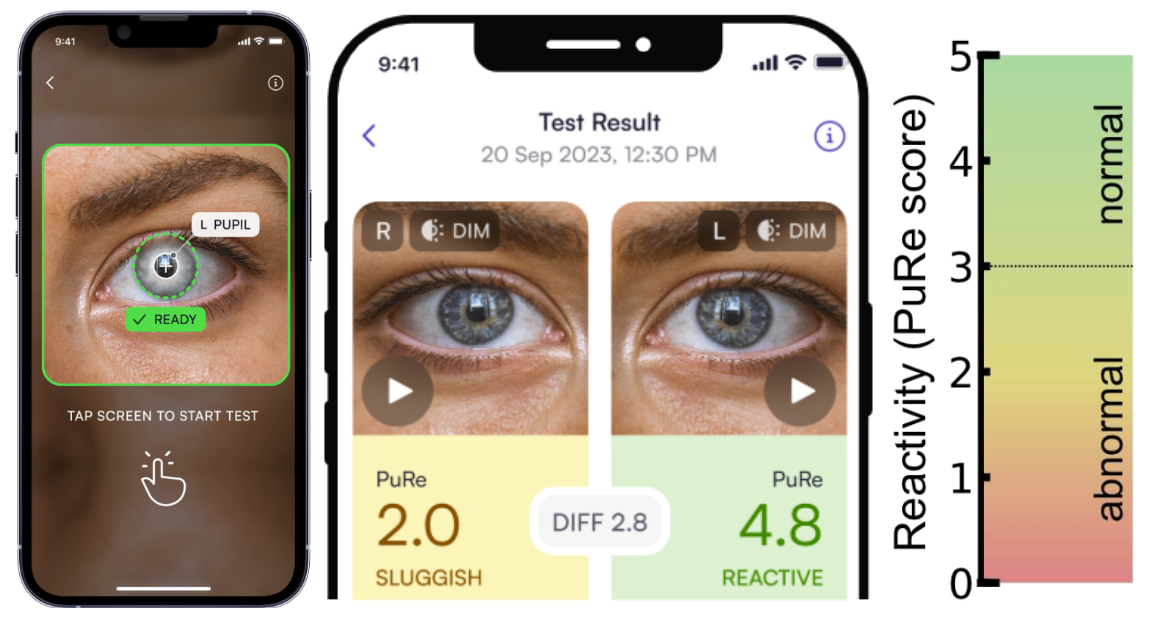
AI Pupillometer (Solvemed, Inc.) mobile app. Left: AI Pupillometer is ready to start a pupil light reflex (PLR) measurement, with the subject’s iris and pupil automatically detected. Middle: Captured videos are ready for viewing, and the Pupil Reactivity (PuRe) score values are displayed. Right: The PuRe score quantifies pupil reactivity on a scale 0–5 (0, non-reactive pupil; 0–3, abnormal/“sluggish” response; 3–5, normal/brisk response). The app provides other pupillometry parameters, such as initial pupil size, constricted pupil size, constriction velocity, among others.

Conventional pupillometers measure pupil size using infrared cameras in specialized hardware. Software pupillometers measure pupil size using a smartphone camera and light source coupled with sophisticated image processing (e.g. computer vision) technology. Several studies have demonstrated that software based pupillometers have comparable accuracy to dedicated hardware pupillometers. By using specialized machine learning algorithms, smartphone pupillometers can compensate for differences in ambient lighting, potentially improving accuracy. Smartphone pupillometry has been clinically validated in the context of traumatic brain injury, sports-related concussion, and acute large vessel occlusion. Due to the high cost of hardware pupillometers (typically thousands of US dollars per unit), software pupillometers have been proposed as a more viable alternative. In addition to their clinical uses, the smaller format and high accessibility make smartphone pupillometers suitable for low resource settings and austere environments, such as hyperbaric conditions.

== Pupillometry in psychology ==
=== Stimulants ===
==== Photographs ====
Hess and Polt (1960) presented pictures of semi-naked adults and babies to adults (four men and two women). Pupils of both sexes dilated after seeing pictures of people of the opposite sex. In females, the difference in pupil size occurred also after seeing pictures of babies and mothers with babies. This examination showed that pupils react not only to the changes of intensity of light (pupillary light reflex) but also reflect arousal or emotions.

In 1965 Hess, Seltzer and Shlien examined pupillary responses in heterosexual and homosexual males. Results showed a greater pupil dilation to pictures of the opposite sex for heterosexuals and to pictures of the same sex for homosexuals.

According to T.M. Simms (1967), pupillary responses of males and females were greater when they were exposed to pictures of the opposite sex. In another study, Nunnally and colleagues (1967) found that seeing slides rated as 'very pleasant' was associated with greater pupil dilation as seeing slides rated as neutral or very unpleasant.

Infants showed greater pupil size when they saw pictures of faces than when they saw geometric shapes, and greater dilation after seeing pictures of the infant's mother than pictures of a stranger.

==== Cognitive load ====
Pupillary responses can reflect activation of the brain allocated to cognitive tasks. Greater pupil dilation is associated with increased processing in the brain. Vacchiano and colleagues (1968) found that pupillary responses were associated with visual exposure to words with high, neutral or low value. Presented low-value words were associated with dilation, and high-value words with constriction of a pupil. In decision-making tasks dilation increased before the decision as a function of cognitive load. In an experiment about short-term serial memory, students heard strings of words and were asked to repeat them. Greater pupil diameter was observed after the items were heard (depending on how many items were heard), and decreased after items were repeated. The more difficult the task, the greater pupil diameter observed from the time preceding the solution until the task was completed. While these discoveries from the 1960s sparked renewed interest in the psychological significance of pupil size, research had substantially earlier identified the relationship between pupil size and effort.

Computational processes in the brain

Sensory information exhibits statistical regularities that humans continuously learn. When these expectations are violated, such as in an oddball paradigm where a deviant stimulus occurs among standards, our perceptual system detects the discrepancy, and the brain responses are generated (mismatch negativity and P300) along with pupil dilations. More complex violations, such as transitions between structured and random sequences, elicit pupil responses that scale with the informational change or surprise in the environment. Larger dilations occur for transitions from predictable to more unpredictable contexts, highlighting that pupil dynamics reflect not only minor sensory deviations but also the statistical structure of the environment.

==== Long-term memory ====
The pupil response reflects long-term memory processes both at encoding, predicting the success of memory formation and at retrieval, reflecting different recognition outcomes.

== See also ==
- Pupil
- Pupilometer
- Neurological Pupil index (NPi)
- Psychophysiology
- Task-invoked pupillary response
