= Pupilometer =

Device for measuring pupil size

Pupillometer, also spelled pupilometer, is a medical device intended to measure by reflected light the size of the pupil of the eye. In addition to measuring pupil size, current automated pupillometers may also be able to characterize pupillary light reflex. Some instruments for measuring pupillary distance (PD) are often, but incorrectly, referred to as pupilometers.

== Manual pupillometry ==
A manual pupillometer measures pupil size via a comparison chart method. There are several types of manual pupillometers. The most common type is the Haab scale, or Haab's pupillometer, which is a series of graduated filled circles on a slide ruler.

== Automated Pupillometry ==
An automated pupillometer is a portable, handheld device that provides a reliable and objective measurement of pupillary size, symmetry, and reactivity through measurement of the pupillary light reflex (PLR). PLR is historically assessed by a nurse or a clinician using a manual flash lamp (sPLR, "s" stands for standard). sPLR is opposed to quantitative PLR (qPLR) that is provided by an automated pupillometer. qPLR corresponds to the percentage of pupillary constriction to a calibrated light stimulus. Independent of examiner, an automated pupillometer offers reproducible and precise measurements by eliminating variability and subjectivity, expressing pupil reactivity numerically so that both pupil size and reactivity can be trended for changes, just like other vital signs. An automated pupillometer also provides a reliable and effective way to quantitatively classify and trend the pupil light response.

The pupillary light reflex is the constriction of the pupils when exposed to bright light, protecting the retina from excessive light exposure. It involves the automatic constriction and dilation of the pupils in response to changes in light intensity or accommodation.

With an automated pupillometer and an algorithm analyzing the pupil continuously for 5 seconds, the Quantitative Pupillometry Index (QPi) can measure pupillary reactivity and provides a numerical value. It provides objective data and can detect subtle changes that might not be apparent to the naked eye. Its quantitative nature provides objective and more reliable assessment. Moreover, the index of Neurolight pupillometer is color-coded for a quick clinical interpretation. It displays through a qualitative scale a quantitative interval for each color associated with its number.

Automated pupillometry removes subjectivity from the pupillary evaluation[5], providing a more accurate trend of pupil data, and allowing earlier detection of changes for more timely patient treatment. Pupil data can be uploaded to the patient record, eliminating the possibility of data entry errors. The pupil size and reactivity are daily measurements and part of the protocol for critically injured or ill patients. They are essential in the clinical monitoring and neurological assessment of the patient. Abnormalities in pupillary responses can be indicative of underlying neurological disorders, such as traumatic brain injury, stroke, cardiac arrest or certain neurodegenerative diseases.

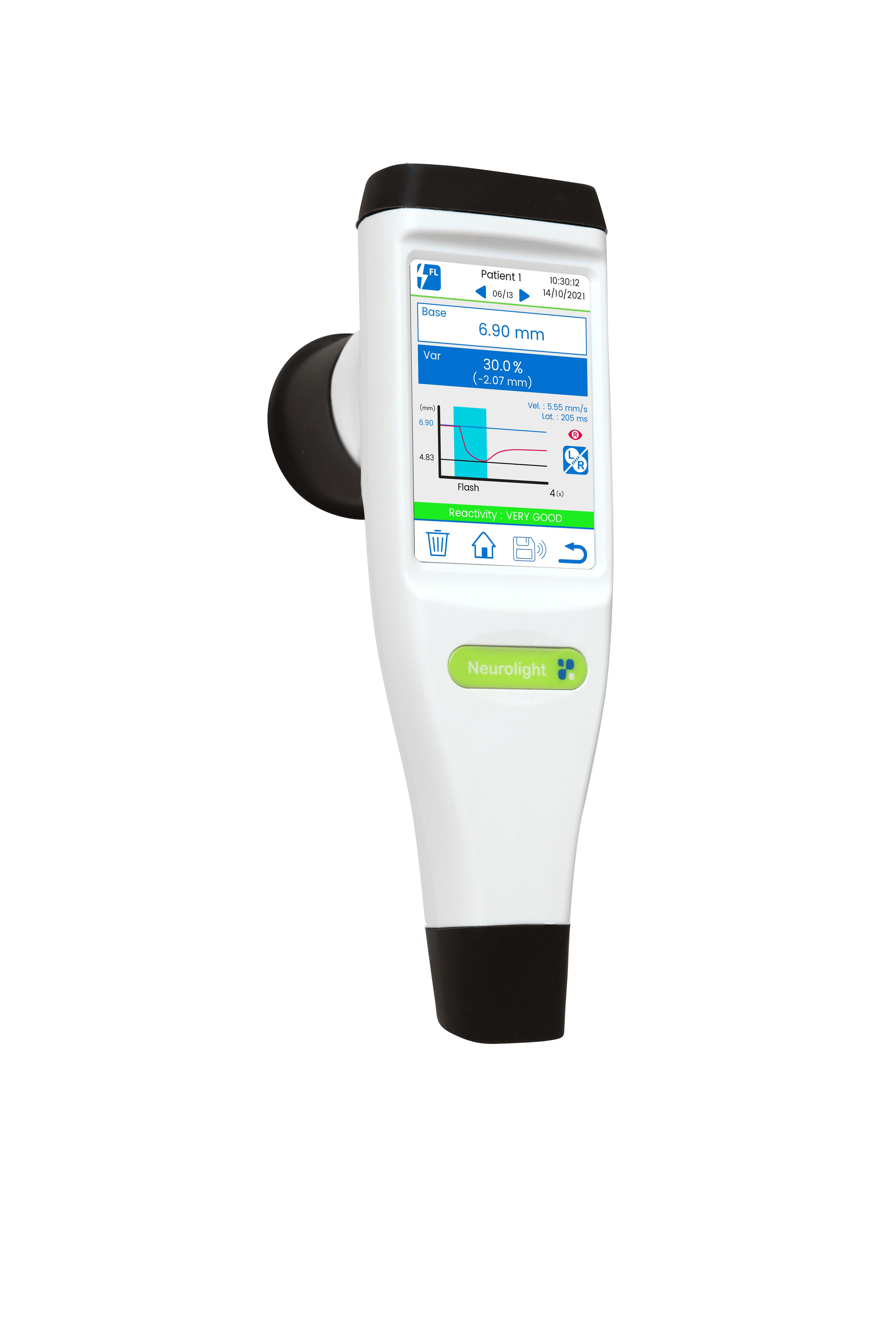
Neurological assessment with NeuroLight pupillometer (IDMED, IDMED Corp.)

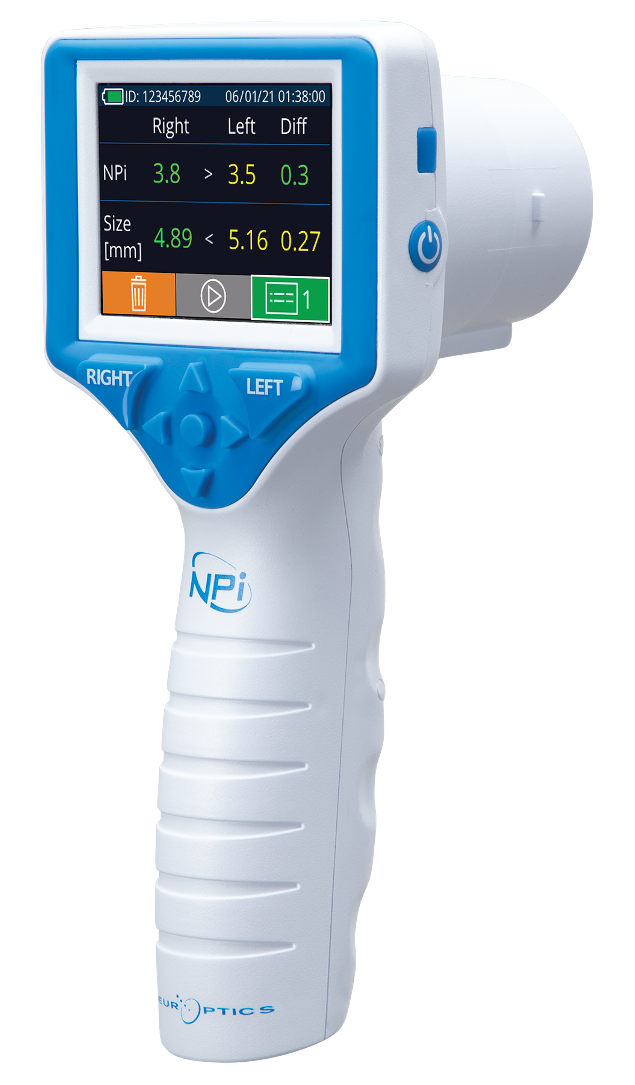
NPi-300 automated infrared pupillometer (NeurOptics, Inc.)

Another automated pupillometer named NeurOptics' Neurological Pupil index (NPi) can offer a consolidated parametric approach to mitigate subjectivity. The NeuroLight and NPi pupillometer are both device for measuring pupils but differ significantly in terms of ergonomics and functionality. The main distinction lies in the NPi's use of a transparent eyecup that contains an electronic component for patient identification and results recording, making it unique to each patient. This consumable allows ambient light to pass through, which can lead to data reproducibility issues. On the other hand, NeuroLight features a touchscreen display and utilizes a reusable opaque eyecup that isolates from ambient light. The NPi and automated pupillometry such as NeuroLight (QPi) have also recently been included in the updated 2020 American Heart Association (AHA) Guidelines for Cardiopulmonary Resuscitation (CPR) and Emergency Cardiovascular Care (ECC) as an objective measurement supporting brain injury prognosis in patients following cardiac arrest. Studies published in peer-reviewed journals continue to demonstrate the effectiveness of NeurOptics' NPi in helping clinicians improve patient outcomes.

The most effective way to use an automated pupillometer is to establish the earliest possible baseline measurement when the patient is admitted into the critical care unit or emergency department, and then trend for changes over time.

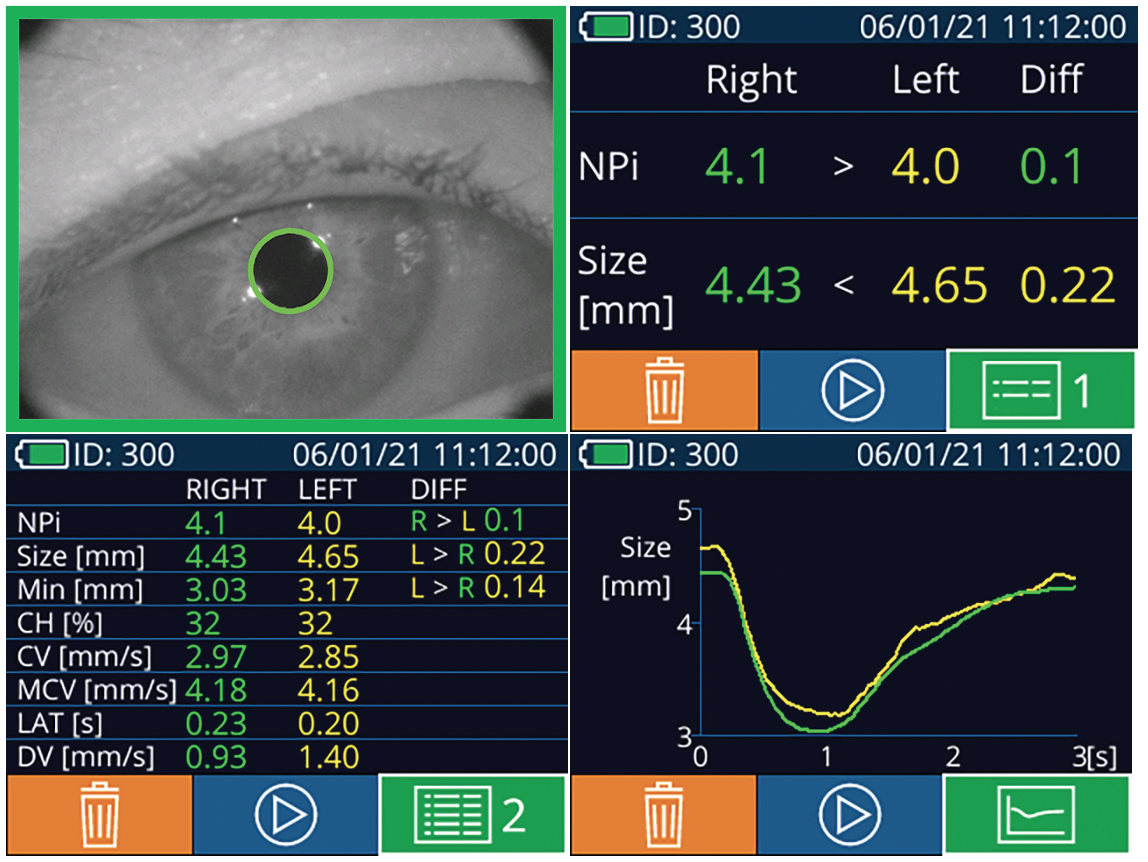
NeurOptics, Inc. Pupillometer Results Screens

The use of automated pupillometry in critical care is a natural progression in technology for routine examination. The pupillometer does not modify the clinical interest of the routine assessment; it removes the margin of error by giving measurements instead of evaluations. Taking a measurement with a pupillometer is very easy and healthcare professionals can start the measurement without the need of calibration. To avoid artifacts in the measurement, it is recommended to use a pupillometer with an opaque eyecup to ambient light. If the eyecup is translucent the ambient light can have a negative impact on the measurements and on their reproducibility. The NeuroLight pupillometer can overcome these constraints thanks to its opaque eyecup.

=== Pupil response ===
Many automated pupilometers can also function as a type of pupil response monitor by measuring pupil dilation in response to a visual stimulus.

In ophthalmology, a pupillary response to light is differentiated from a pupillary response to focus (i.e. pupils may constrict on near focus, as with the Argyll Robertson pupil) in the diagnosis of tertiary syphilis. Although a pupillometer can be used, the diagnosis is often made with a penlight & near-point card

The extent of dilation of the pupil in the eye could be an indicator of interest and attention. Methods of reliable measurement of cognitive load, such as the dilation or constriction of the pupils, are used in marketing research to assess the attractiveness of TV commercials. Dilation of the pupils reflects an increase in mental processes, whether it be attentiveness, or psychomotor responsiveness. The pupil response has also been found to reflect long-term memory processes both at encoding, predicting the success of memory formation, and at retrieval reflecting the operation of different recognition outcomes. In summary, pupillary response refers to the changes in pupil size that occur in response to light, emotional stimuli, or cognitive processes. In addition, monitoring can provide valuable insights into the functioning of the automatic nervous system and aid in the diagnosis and management of neurological disorders.

== Pupillary Distance Measurement ==
In the context of dispensing eyeglasses, some instruments for measuring PD are colloquially referred to as a pupillometer even though "interpupillometer" is the appropriate term for this instrument. There are many ways to measure PD ranging from a simple ruler (or "PD stick") traditionally used by eye care professionals (ECP) to the so-called pupillometers to state of the art digital systems that may offer better accuracy and precision while also allowing for various other measurements (e.g., vertex distance, pantoscopic tilt, wrap, etc.) to be taken. Measurement accuracy is more of a concern for progressive lenses where small deviations can severely impact visual performance.

The PD measuring instruments referred to as a pupillometers are optical devices that rest on the nose bridge similar to eyeglass frames and work by sighting the corneal reflection produced by an internally-mounted coaxial light source (e.g. Essilor Corneal Reflection Pupillometer). These instruments are most commonly used for fitting glasses (i.e., center the lenses on the visual axes). However, they may also be used to verify a PD measurements taken with a PD stick. Since these instruments do not measure any actual pupil parameters (e.g., size, symmetry, reflex, etc.), they do not fall under the medical device definition of a pupillometer.

In addition to having PD measured in a retail setting, a variety of web and mobile (Android and iOS) apps are now widely available. Web apps are used by a variety of online sellers of eyeglasses where an object of known size, such as a credit card, is needed to assist (size reference) the measurement process. Some mobile apps have eliminated the need for a reference object to make accurate PD measurements by leveraging depth imaging and advanced algorithms now available on some mobile platforms.

== See also ==
- Pupil
- Pupillometry
- Neurological Pupil index (NPi)
- Psychophysiology
