= Lens induced glaucomas =

Disorder of the human eye

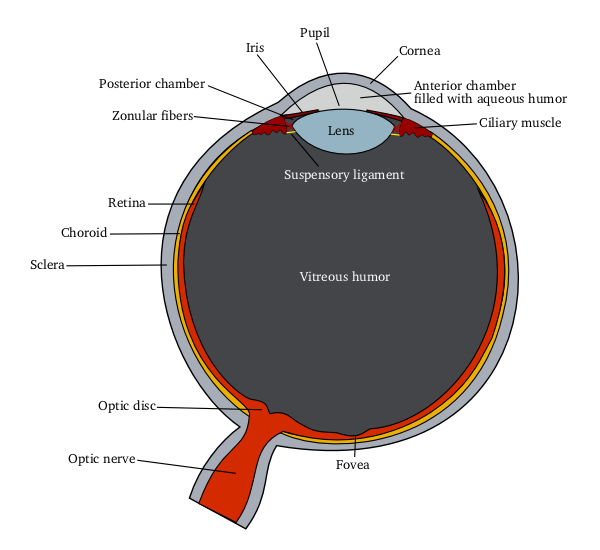
- Anatomy of the eye
- Specialty: Ophthalmology
- Complications: Blindness
- Diagnostic method: Eye examination

The crystalline lens inside the human eye has been implicated as a causative factor in many forms of glaucoma. Lens induced glaucomas or Lens related glaucomas are either open-angle or closed-angle glaucomas that can occur due to a neglected advanced cataract (cloudiness of the lens) or a dislocated lens. It is a type of secondary glaucoma. The angle-closure glaucoma can be caused by a swollen or dislocated lens. The open-angle glaucoma can be caused by leakage of lens proteins through the capsule of a mature or hyper mature cataract or by a hypersensitivity reaction to own lens protein following surgery or penetrating trauma.

== Types ==
=== Closed angle ===
==== Phacomorphic glaucoma ====
The presence of an asymmetric mature cataractous lens, shallow or closed anterior chamber angle, raised intraocular pressure (IOP) and other typical signs and symptoms of angle-closure glaucoma in the eye may lead to a diagnosis of phacomorphic glaucoma. Cataract surgery after initial IOP control with medication is the only treatment. Rarely direct compression of angle by intumescent lens may also cause angle closure.

==== Glaucoma secondary to ectopia lentis ====
Ectopia lentis is a displacement or malposition of the eye's crystalline lens from its normal location. The displace lens leads to pupillary block and secondary glaucoma.

==== Spherophakia ====
Spherophakia is a rare congenital bilateral eye disease. The main symptoms are a smaller and more spherical crystalline lens and weak zonules. due to weak zonules, the lens may undergo subluxation or dislocation, leading to pupillary block and secondary glaucoma.

=== Open angle ===
==== Phacolytic glaucoma ====
Phacolytic glaucoma is a type of secondary glaucoma caused by the leakage of lens material through the capsule of a mature cataract. The leaked lens material may obstruct the trabecular meshwork leading to decreased aqueous humor outflow and increased intraocular pressure.

==== Lens particle glaucoma ====
Lens particle glaucoma also known as phacotoxic glaucoma. Following surgery or injury, lens material may leak into outside the lens capsule. Large lens fragments spontaneously break up into smaller and sometimes invisible particles. lens material entering the anterior chamber can obstruct aqueous outflow and cause glaucoma.

==== Phacoantigenic glaucoma ====
Phacoantigenic glaucoma was formerly known as Phacoanaphylaxis. In this inflammatory reaction against own lens antigens leads to obstruction of the trabecular meshwork and increased IOP.

== Diagnosis ==
Tonometry is used to measure intraocular pressure. Gonioscopy is the gold-standard for measuring angle of anterior chamber and confirming angle closure.

== Treatment ==
Cataract surgery after initial IOP control with medication or laser is the definitive treatment for any type of lens induced glaucomas.

== History ==
Lens induced glaucoma was first described by Gifford in 1900 as a secondary glaucoma associated with hypermature senile cataract. In the same year von Reuss described it as a glaucoma associated with spontaneous absorption of lens substance through intact lens capsule.

== See also ==
- Glaucoma
- Secondary glaucoma
- Cataract
- Cataract surgery
- Ectopia lentis
- Phacomorphic glaucoma
- Phacolytic glaucoma
- Intraocular pressure
- Anterior chamber angle
