= Sampaolesi line =

Clinical sign in eye examinations

Sampaolesi line is a sign which may be observed during a clinical eye examination. During gonioscopy (where the structures of the eye's anterior segment are examined), if an abundance of brown pigment is seen at or anterior to Schwalbe's line, a Sampaolesi line is said to be present. The presence of a Sampaolesi line can signify pigment dispersion syndrome or pseudoexfoliation syndrome.

Gonioscopy is performed during eye examinations, which involves placing a mirrored lens on the patient's cornea in order to visualise the angle of the anterior chamber of the eye.

== Causes ==
- Idiopathic
- Pigment Dispersion Syndrome
- Pseudoexfoliation syndrome
