= Schwartz–Matsuo syndrome =

- Other names: Schwartz's syndrome
- Specialty: Ophthalmology
- Complications: Secondary glaucoma, Blindness
- Diagnostic method: Eye examination
- Treatment: Medical (for increased IOP) and surgery (for retinal detachment)

Schwartz–Matsuo syndrome (also known as Schwartz's syndrome) is a human eye disease characterised by rhegmatogenous retinal detachment, elevated intraocular pressure (IOP) and open angle of anterior chamber.

== Signs and symptoms ==
Aqueous cells without the signs of uveitis, elevated intraocular pressure and rhegmatogenous retinal detachment with tears around the ora serrata are the main signs of Schwartz–Matsuo syndrome. Intraocular pressure can be as high as 60–70 mm Hg and is responsive to aqueous suppressants. Eye pain, blurred vision, headache, nausea, or vomiting may occur due to elevated intraocular pressure. Visual field defects, photopsia, floaters, blurring of vision etc. may occur due to retinal detachment.

== Pathophysiology ==
Schwartz–Matsuo syndrome is an eye disease characterized by rhegmatogenous retinal detachment, and elevated intraocular pressure (usually in the evening) and open anterior chamber angle with presence of aqueous cells. Schwartz hypothesized iridocyclitis as the cause of elevated intraocular pressure, but Davidorf suggested that the elevated IOP may be due to obstruction of trabecular meshwork by pigmented cells representing photoreceptor outer segments from retinal pigment epithelium that migrate anteriorly within the aqueous humor. Later, Matsuo et al. isolated photoreceptor outer segments and inflammatory cells in aqueous humor and hypothesized that photoreceptor outer segments pass through the retinal break cause aqueous outflow obstruction and elevated IOP.

== Diagnosis ==
Systemic examination to identify patients who are at risk of a retinal break around the ora serrata. Ophthalmoscopy, dilated fundus examination or OCT may be used to rule out retinal detachment.

=== Differential Diagnosis ===
- Iritis is an inflammatory condition in which aqueous cells are present, but aqueous cells in Schwartz-Matsuo syndrome are unresponsive to corticosteroid treatment.
- Open angle glaucoma is a condition in which intraocular pressure is raised and anterior chamber angle is open.
- Posner–Schlossman syndrome is a condition in which very mild anterior chamber inflammation with few aqueous cells and little aqueous flare and few keratic precipitates are present. Unlike Schwartz-Matsuo syndrome it responds to steroid treatment.

== Treatment ==
Surgically correct retinal detachment by scleral buckle or pars plana vitrectomy. Prior to surgery, oral or topical antiglaucoma drugs may be used to reduce IOP. After surgical correction of the retinal detachment, the condition resolves, aqueous cells disappear and IOP normalizes. The condition is not responsive to corticosteroid therapy.

== History ==
The Schwartz–Matsuo syndrome was first described by Schwartz in 1973.
