= Phacomorphic glaucoma =

Disorder of the human eye

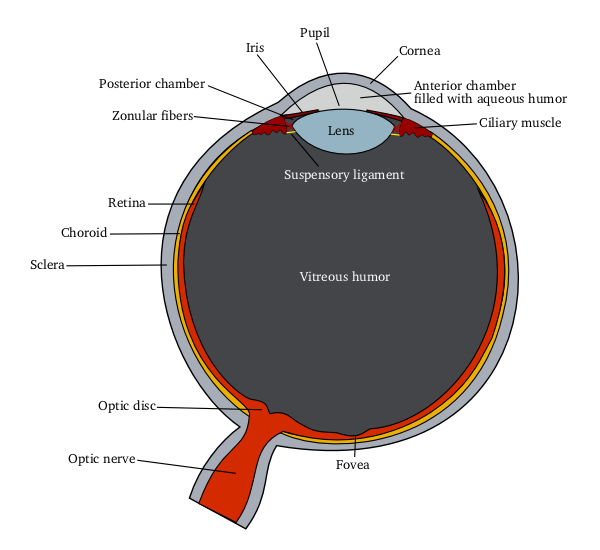
- Anatomy of the eye
- Specialty: Ophthalmology
- Complications: Blindness
- Diagnostic method: Eye examination
- Differential diagnosis: Phacolytic glaucoma

Phacomorphic glaucoma is an eye disease that can occur due to a neglected advanced cataract. In this, the mature cataractous lens cause secondary angle closure glaucoma. The presence of an asymmetric mature cataractous lens, shallow or closed anterior chamber angle, raised intraocular pressure (IOP) and other typical signs and symptoms of angle-closure glaucoma in the eye may lead to a diagnosis of phacomorphic glaucoma. Cataract surgery after initial IOP control with medication is the only treatment.

Phacomorphic glaucoma is one of the most common causes of secondary angle closure glaucoma in developing countries like India.

== Signs and symptoms ==
Patient may come with the complaint of significant eye pain. Eye examination will show an elevated intraocular pressure. IOP did not respond to topical antiglaucoma drugs. Asymmetric mature cataractous lens, shallow or closed angle of anterior chamber, an elevated IOP and other typical signs and symptoms of angle-closure glaucoma in the eye led to the diagnosis of Phacomorphic glaucoma.

== Pathophysiology ==
A mature and bulging lens causes pupillary block and the iris to be pushed forward. A forward iris closes the angle and obstructs aqueous humor flow. This leads to elevated intraocular pressure and optic nerve damage. Rarely direct compression of angle by intumescent lens may also cause angle closure.

== Diagnosis ==
Tonometry is used to measure intraocular pressure. Gonioscopy is the gold-standard for measuring angle of anterior chamber and confirming angle closure.

== Treatment ==
Treatment of phacomorphic glaucoma may require medical therapy, laser peripheral iridotomy or incisional surgery to quickly lower the pressure as a first step. Cataract surgery should be done after initial IOP control with medication or laser.

== Epidemiology ==
Phacomorphic glaucoma is one of the most common (incidence 3.91%) causes of secondary angle closure glaucoma in developing countries like India.

== See also ==
- Lens induced glaucomas
