= Van Herick technique =

Eye examination method

The Van Herick technique is an eye examination method used to determine the size of the anterior chamber angle of the eye.

Glaucoma is currently the principal cause of irreversible blindness in the world. Therefore, The Van Herick technique is pertinent to the interests of all eye care practitioners as it permits for a quick and simple screening alternative to the conventional Gonioscopy examination. It should not however, be used as a replacement for the gonioscopy examination but rather be used as a means of refuting or confirming the results of a gonioscopy examination.

The Van Herick's technique has become the most commonly used qualitative method of assessing the size of the anterior chamber angle (ACA). Whereby, it involves comparing the depth of the peripheral anterior chamber to the thickness of the cornea, when a narrow beam is shone within the limbus at a 60°angle. The anterior chamber drainage angle is then graded as a ratio between the peripheral anterior chamber depth and corneal thickness (AC : C ratio) or expressed traditionally as a fraction to provide the Van Herick's result. Grading can also be obtained by distinguishing the structures visible upon observation. Each visible structure correlates to a Van Herick grade which can then be expressed a fraction.

== Equipment ==
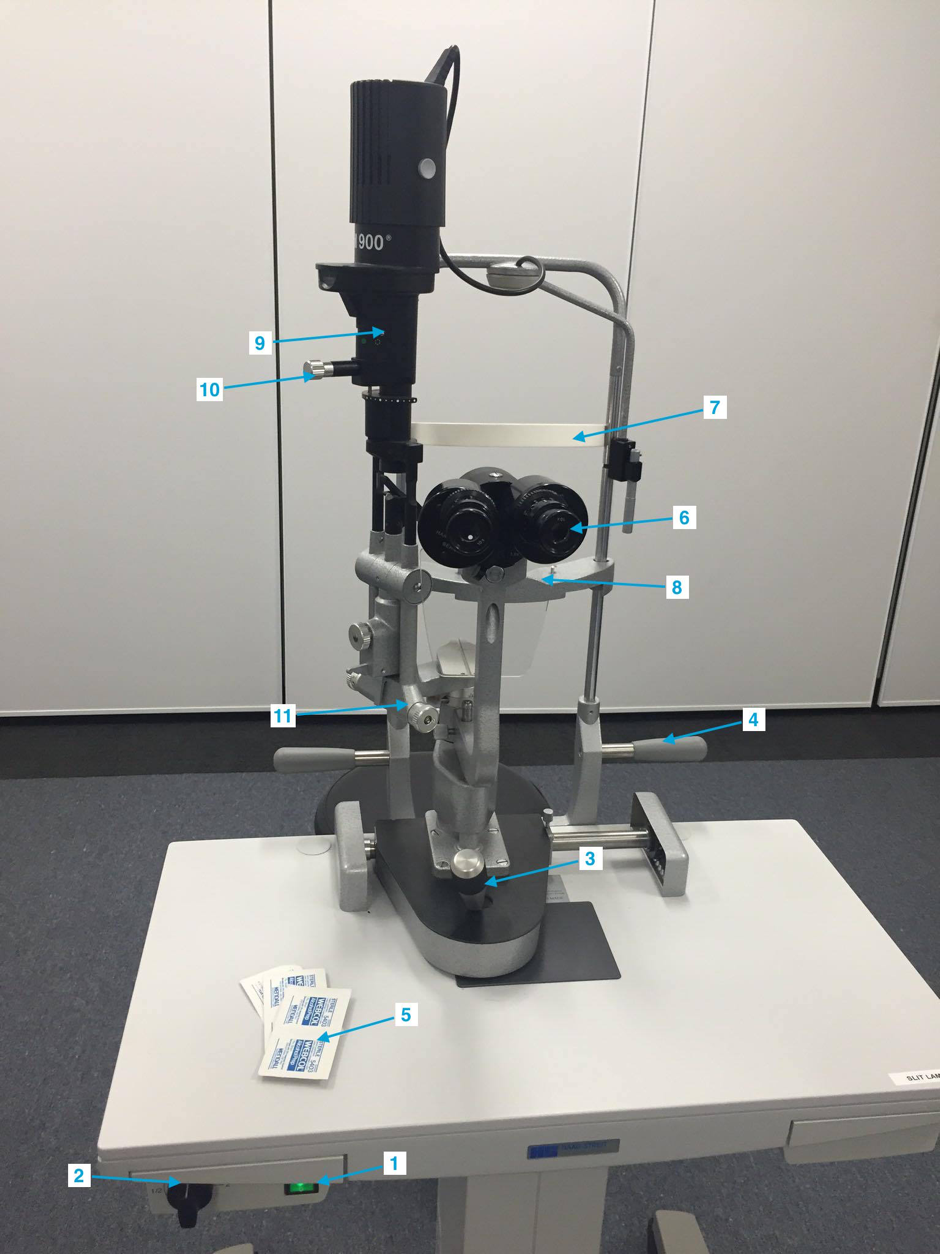
Labelled image of slit lamp: 1. On/off switch; 2. Illumination; 3. Joystick; 4. Handles for patient; 5. Alcohol swabs; 6. Eyepieces; 7. Forehead rest; 8. Chin rest; 9. Filter Changing Knob; 10. Slit beam length knob; 11. Slit beam width knob

- Slit lamp biomicroscope (settings: High rheostat illumination, Medium magnification (10–16×) 2
- Alcohol swabs: Used to maintain hygiene for the patient

== Method ==
The technique was initially designed by Van Herich, performed with the utilization of a slit lamp without the requirement of any additional aids. It facilitates a simple and quick assessment of the lateral chamber angle. The method involves a narrow slit of light from a slit lamp being projected onto the peripheral cornea at an angle of 60⁰ as near as possible to the limbus. The resulting image is a slit that is projected onto the surface of the cornea, the width is then used as a reference for the grading of the angle. The width of the angle is graded by the distance between the corneal slit image and the slit image on the iris.

== Test Requirement ==
The test should be performed in a dim lit room with the patient directed to fixate on a distance target to minimize any fluctuations of accommodation and pupil size.

== Setting up the patient ==
1. Use alcohol wipes to wipe down all surfaces that have been exposed to prior patients, predominately the forehead and chin rest
2. Make all necessary adjustments for patient comfort:
  - Adjust chair and slit lamp for correct height
  - Align the patient's eye using the chin rest adjuster ensuring that the eye lines up with the alignment marker
  - The eyepieces should be focused for the examiner (this can be enabled if the examiner knows their own refractive error and uses the dioptric scale that is found on most slit lamps). Due to proximal accommodation and convergence often a little more minus is required.
  - The pupillary distance (pd) should be adjusted for the examiner

=== Steps ===
1. Adjust the Slit-lamp biomicroscope to the below settings:
  - High rheostat illumination
  - Medium magnification (10–16×) 2
1. Place the illumination system offset at an angle of 60° temporal to the microscope observation system
2. Adjust the slit size to the narrowest possible width
3. Position the slit beam so that it is perpendicular to the cornea, ensure that the corneal section is as close as possible to the temporal limbus, yet still allowing a clear conception of the gap between the posterior cornea and the projection of the slit beam on to the iris
4. Estimate the width of the gap: which accounts for the distance between the anterior chamber depth (ACD) as a fraction (or ratio) of the corneal section thickness, focusing on the central portion of the beam.
5. Utilize the Van Herick grading system to record results

== Recording and Interpretation ==
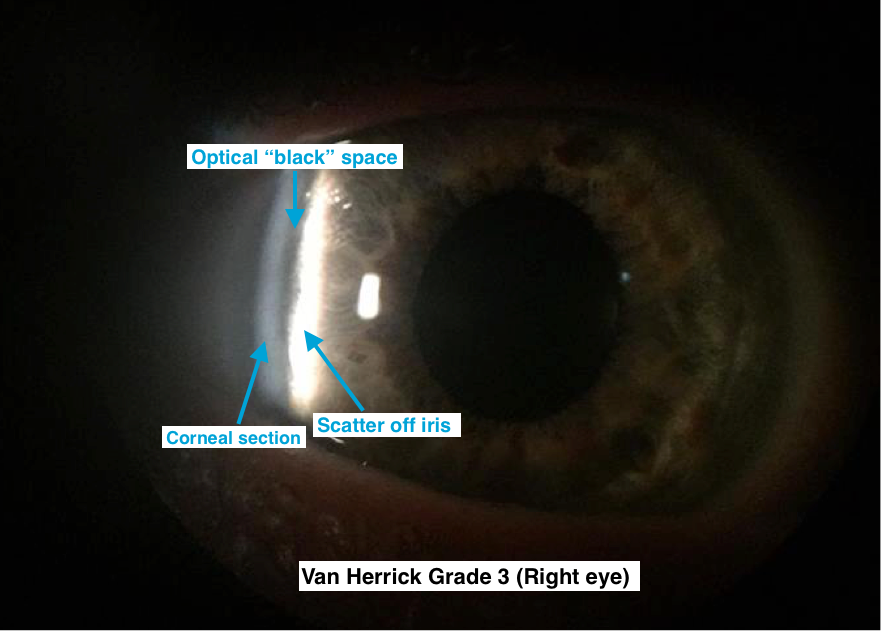
This image is of the angle of the eye as seen through a slit lamp. It is labelled as Grade 3 according to Van Herick's grading system.

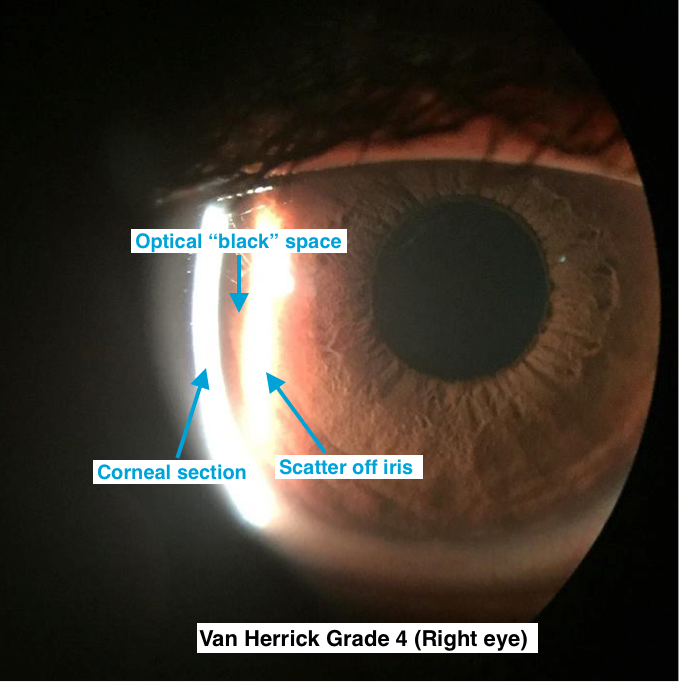
This image is of the angle of the eye as seen through a slit lamp. It is labelled as Grade 4 according to Van Herick's Grading system.

The Van Herick's technique compares the depth of the peripheral anterior chamber with the cornea thickness, usually written as a fraction however, it can also be expressed as a ratio (see table 3). By grading the angle using the Van Herick technique it also allows an estimation of the probability of closure and an estimated angle in degrees (see table 2).

Table 1 - Fraction Grading, by region
Chamber Depth in Corneal Thickness	Angle Grade
≥cornea	4
1/4 to 1/2	3
1/4	2
<1/4	1
Slit	Dangerously Narrow

Table 2 - Van Herick's technique Grading of the anterior chamber
Grade	Estimated Angle	Probability of Closure
Grade 0	0°	Closed
Grade 1	≈10°	Very likely
Grade 2	≈20°	Possible
Grade 3	≈30°	Unlikely
Grade 4	≥45°	Impossible

Table 3 - Van Herick grading expressed as a ratio
Ratio	Angle Closure	Angle Grade
1:1	Open Angle	VH grade 4
1:1/2	Open angle	VH grade 3
1:1/4	Narrow angle	VH grade 2
1: <1/4	Angle Closure likely	VH grade 1

== Evaluation/Limitations ==
Unfortunately, although the Van Herick offers a quick and simple alternative to gonioscopy examinations, it also comes with limitations to its results. Principally, it has been deduced that measurements performed at the nasal limbus tend to overestimate the angle width. Moreover, although the technique relies on the subjective assessment of the observed structures, it has been found that the results are not easily replicated and there was a high level of variability depending on the perception of the examiner. The technique also may be considered of inadequate scope, as it only provides an estimate of the anterior chamber angle (ACA) at the temporal limbus, in contrast with gonioscopy, which allows for a 360 degree view of the anterior chamber. Furthermore, the Van Herick technique has been found to be exceedingly sensitive to the positioning of the direct slit-lamp beam whereby a 10 degrees deviation from the perpendicular direction was found to be critical to the results and measurements.

In addition, the ACA (anterior chamber angle) ratio was found to be highly dependent on the corneal thickness as a thin cornea would result in a larger ratio than that of a thicker cornea.

In conclusion, although the Van Herick technique for anterior chamber angle assessment offers many benefits including being non-invasive, quick, a comparatively accessible technique, with satisfactory specificity and sensitivity values, for the detection of angle closure; it is nonetheless not devoid of limitations. Most of the sources of variability may be simply overcome with the direct measurement of the depth of the anterior chamber through utilisation of equipment such as the Pentacam or imaging digital image analysis, rather than by merely grading the fraction between the anterior chamber depth and the corneal thickness.
