= Scleral spur =

Annular structure composed of collagen in the human eye

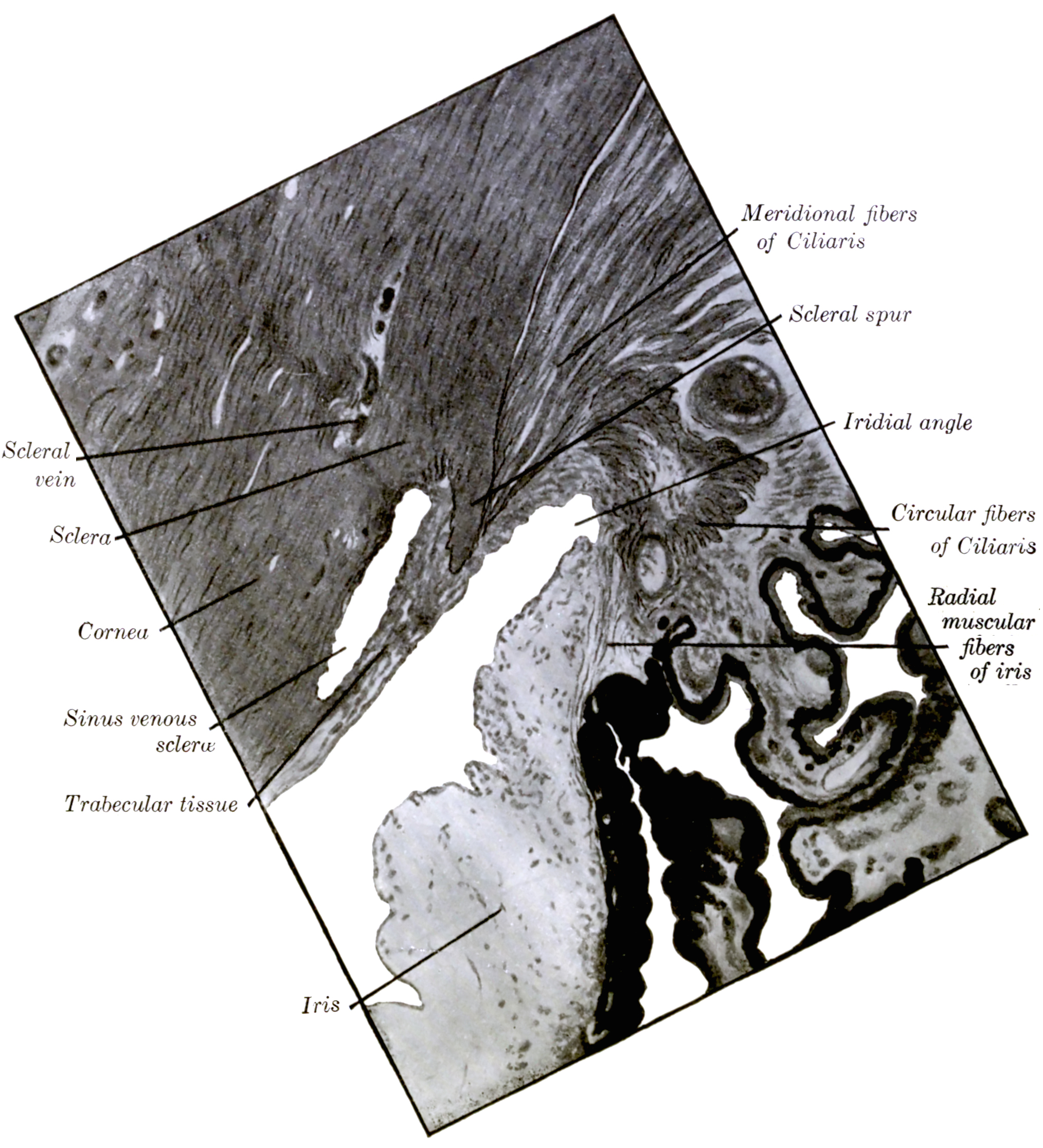
- Enlarged general view of the iridial angle (Scleral spur appear at upper right)

Details
- System: Visual system

Identifiers
- Latin: Calcar sclerae

The scleral spur in the visual system is a protrusion of the sclera (the white of the eye) into the anterior chamber. The spur is an annular structure composed of collagen in the human eye.

It is the origin of the longitudinal and circular fibres (which swerve acutely from the spur to run circumferentially, as a sphincter near the periphery of the lens) of the ciliary muscle, and is attached posteriorly to the trabecular meshwork.

== Role in treatment of Glaucoma ==
Open-angle glaucoma (OAG) and closed-angle glaucoma (CAG) may be treated by muscarinic receptor agonists (e.g., pilocarpine), which cause rapid miosis and contraction of the ciliary muscles. This pulls the scleral spur and results in the trabecular meshwork being stretched and separated.

This opens the fluid pathways, and facilitates drainage of the aqueous humour into the canal of Schlemm, ultimately resulting in decreasing of the intraocular pressure.

== Additional images ==
Gonioscopy of the anterior chamber angle

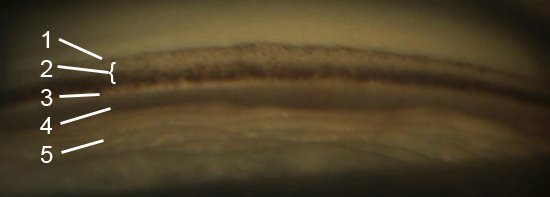
Gonioscopy of the anterior chamber angle. Labeled structures: 1. Schwalbe's line, 2. Trabecular meshwork (TM), 3. Scleral spur, 4. Ciliary body, 5. Iris

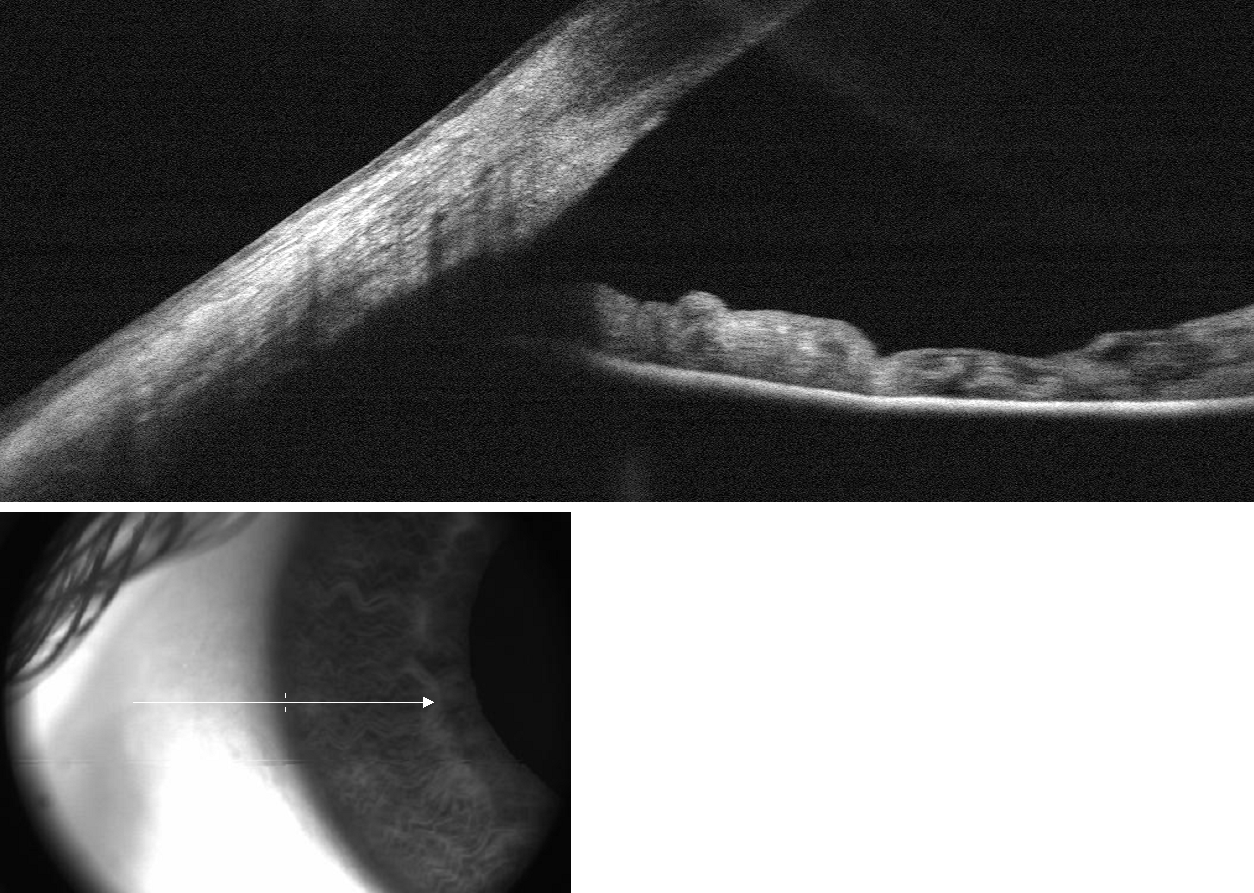
Anterior chamber angle cross-section imaged by an SD-OCT.

== See also ==
- Eye care professional
- Ophthalmology
- Orthoptics
- Vision rehabilitation
