= Pilocarpus jaborandi =

Scientific classification
- Kingdom: Plantae
- Clade: Embryophytes
- Clade: Tracheophytes
- Clade: Spermatophytes
- Clade: Angiosperms
- Clade: Eudicots
- Clade: Rosids
- Order: Sapindales
- Family: Rutaceae
- Genus: Pilocarpus
- Species: P. jaborandi

Binomial name
- Pilocarpus jaborandi Holmes

Synonyms
- Pilocarpus cearensis Rizzini; Pilocarpus officinalis Poehl

Species of flowering plant

Pilocarpus jaborandi is a species of flowering plant in the family Rutaceae, native to northeast Brazil. It is a source of the drug pilocarpine.
