= Posner–Schlossman syndrome =

Medical condition

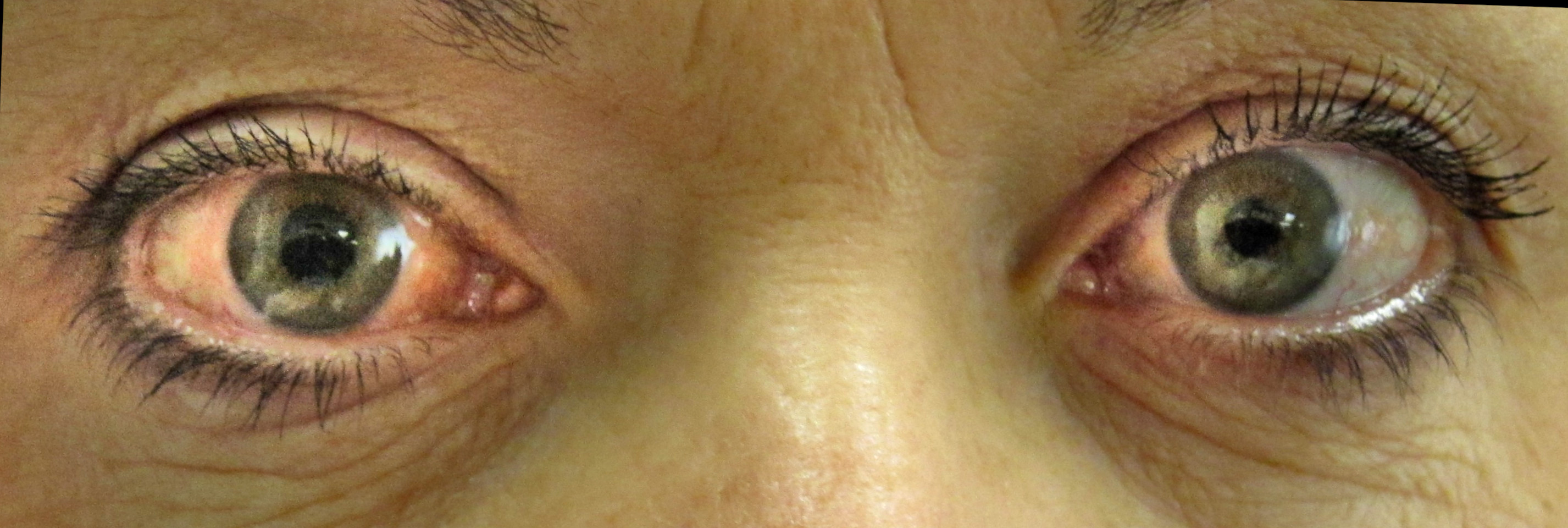
Acute angle closure glaucoma of the right eye

Posner–Schlossman syndrome (PSS) also known as glaucomatocyclitic crisis (GCC) is a rare acute ocular condition with unilateral attacks of mild granulomatous anterior uveitis and elevated intraocular pressure. It is sometimes considered as a secondary inflammatory glaucoma.

== Signs and symptoms ==
Ocular hypertension (IOP 30 - 70 mmHg) with open angle of anterior chamber and unilateral mild granulomatous anterior uveitis are hallmark signs of Posner–Schlossman syndrome. On slit-lamp examination, conjunctival injections, epithelial corneal edema, small to medium-sized fine keratitic precipitates, aqueous cells and flare may also be noted. Blurring of vision, eye pain and discomfort are the main symptoms. Colored halos may occur due to elevated intra-ocular pressure (IOP). Symptoms last from several hours to weeks and may be recurrent. IOP and aqueous humor outflow return to normal in the remission periods.

== Etiology ==
Exact etiology of PSS is unknown. Since it was first described, a number of noninfectious etiological theories have been proposed including autonomic dysregulation, allergy, variation of developmental glaucoma, autoimmune/HLA-Bw54 and abnormality of the ciliary vasculature. Initially, infectious etiologies were not considered because of the episodic nature of the acute attacks. Recently, infectious theories associated with organisms like Helicobacter pylori, herpes simplex virus, varicella zoster virus, Cytomegalovirus, Borrelia burgdorferi, etc. have also emerged in medical literature.

== Treatment ==
Main aim of treatment is to reduce IOP and decrease inflammation.

=== Medical ===
Topical steroids, such as prednisolone acetate can be used to decrease the uveal inflammation. Topical or oral non-steroidal anti-inflammatory agents may be used to avoid steroid-induced complications like secondary glaucoma. Prostaglandin analogs such as latanoprost or bimatoprost, beta-blockers such as timolol, alpha-2 agonists such as brimonidine, muscarinic agents such as pilocarpine, hyperosmotic agents such as mannitol and carbonic anhydrase inhibitors such as acetazolamide, methazolamide or dorzolamide are the drugs used to decrease IOP.

=== Surgical ===
If the elevated IOP is not responsive to medical treatment, glaucoma surgeries may be considered to prevent visual field loss.

== Epidemiology ==
It usually affects adults between the ages of twenty and fifty and is more common in males than females. One study from Finland found that the incidence of disease is 0.4 and its prevalence is 1.9 out of 100,000.

== History ==
Posner and Schlossman first identified and described the syndrome in 1948. They first reported a series of 9 cases and given the name glaucomatocyclitic crisis to describe this condition.
