= Pilocarpine =

Medication used to treat glaucoma and dry mouth

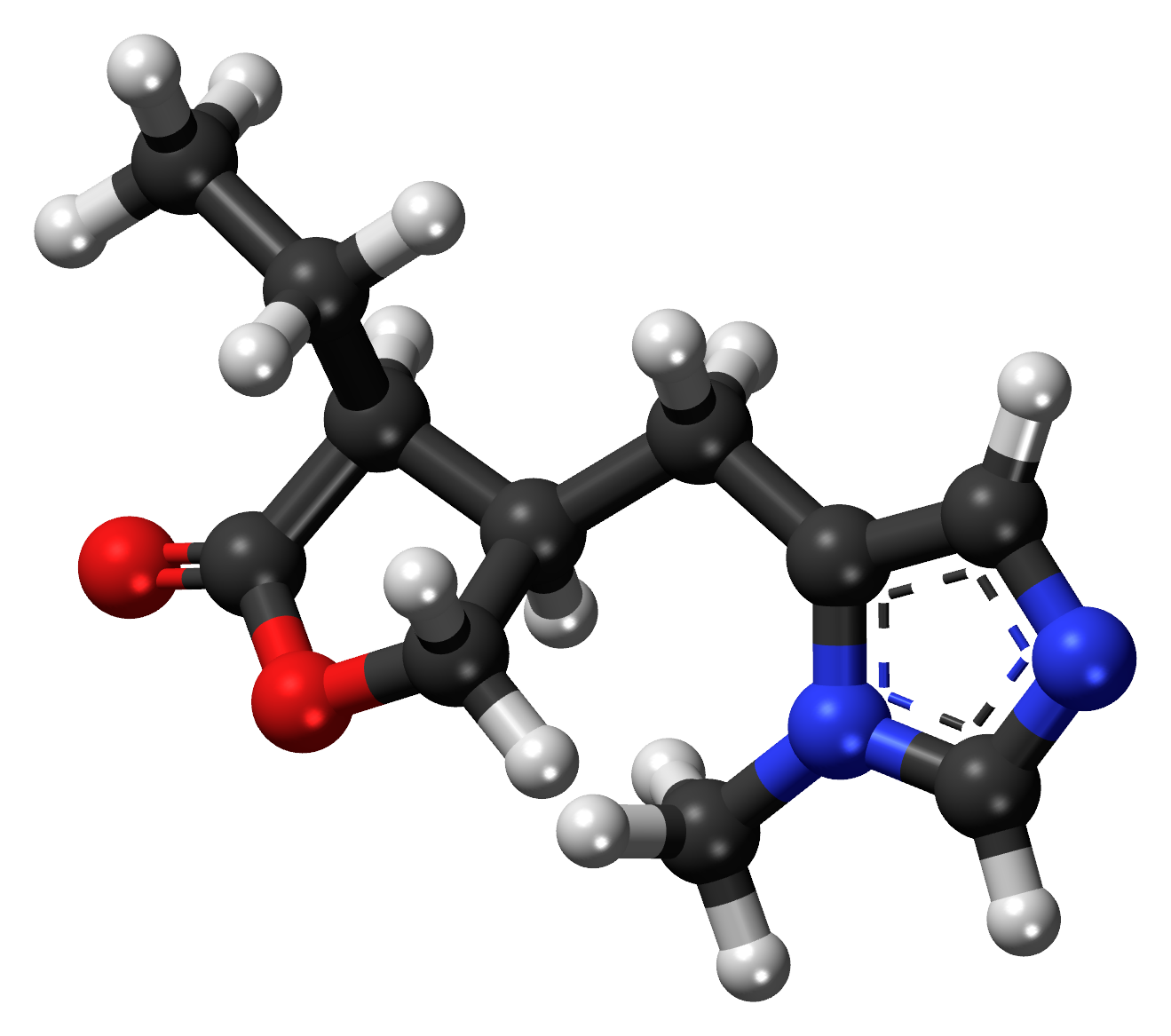

Clinical data
- Trade names: Isopto Carpine, Salagen, others
- AHFS/Drugs.com: Monograph
- MedlinePlus: a608039
- License data: US DailyMed: Pilocarpine
- Pregnancy category: AU: B3
- Routes of administration: Ophthalmic, by mouth
- Drug class: Cholinergic, Miotic
- ATC code: N07AX01 (WHO) S01EB01 (WHO)

Legal status
- Legal status: AU: S4 (Prescription only); UK: POM (Prescription only); US: ℞-only

Pharmacokinetic data
- Elimination half-life: 0.76 hours (5 mg), 1.35 hours (10 mg)
- Excretion: Urine

Identifiers
- IUPAC name: (3S,4R)-3-Ethyl-4-((1-methyl-1H-imidazol-5-yl)methyl)dihydrofuran-2(3H)-one
- CAS Number: 92-13-7; 54-71-7
- PubChem CID: 5910
- IUPHAR/BPS: 305
- DrugBank: DB01085
- ChemSpider: 5699
- UNII: 01MI4Q9DI3; 0WW6D218XJ
- KEGG: D00525; D02200
- ChEBI: CHEBI:8207
- ChEMBL: ChEMBL550
- CompTox Dashboard (EPA): DTXSID1021162
- ECHA InfoCard: 100.001.936

Chemical and physical data
- Formula: C_{11}H_{16}N_{2}O_{2}
- Molar mass: 208.261 g·mol^{−1}
- 3D model (JSmol): Interactive image
- SMILES: O=C2OC[C@H](Cc1n(cnc1)C)[C@@H]2CC
- InChI: InChI=1S/C11H16N2O2/c1-3-10-8(6-15-11(10)14)4-9-5-12-7-13(9)2/h5,7-8,10H,3-4,6H2,1-2H3/t8-,10-/m0/s1; Key:QCHFTSOMWOSFHM-WPRPVWTQSA-N

Pilocarpine is a lactone alkaloid originally extracted from plants of the Pilocarpus genus. It is used as a medication to reduce pressure inside the eye and treat dry mouth. As an eye drop it is used to manage angle closure glaucoma until surgery can be performed, ocular hypertension, primary open angle glaucoma, and to constrict the pupil after dilation. However, due to its side effects, it is no longer typically used for long-term management. Onset of effects with the drops is typically within an hour and lasts for up to a day. By mouth it is used for dry mouth as a result of Sjögren's disease or radiation therapy.

Common side effects of the eye drops include irritation of the eye, increased tearing, headache, and blurry vision. Other side effects include allergic reactions and retinal detachment. Use is generally not recommended during pregnancy. Pilocarpine is in the miotics family of medication. It works by activating cholinergic receptors of the muscarinic type which cause the trabecular meshwork to open and the aqueous humor to drain from the eye.

Pilocarpine was isolated in 1874 by Hardy and Gerrard and has been used to treat glaucoma for more than 100 years. It is on the World Health Organization's List of Essential Medicines. It was originally made from the South American plant Pilocarpus.

== Medical uses ==
Pilocarpine stimulates the secretion of large amounts of saliva and sweat. It is used to prevent or treat dry mouth, particularly in Sjögren syndrome, but also as a side effect of radiation therapy for head and neck cancer.

It may be used to help differentiate Adie syndrome from other causes of unequal pupil size.

It may be used to treat a form of dry eye called aqueous deficient dry eye (ADDE).

=== Surgery ===
Pilocarpine is sometimes used immediately before certain types of corneal grafts and cataract surgery. It is also used prior to YAG laser iridotomy. In ophthalmology, pilocarpine is also used to reduce symptomatic glare at night from lights when the patient has undergone implantation of phakic intraocular lenses; the use of pilocarpine would reduce the size of the pupils, partially relieving these symptoms. The most common concentration for this use is pilocarpine 1%. Pilocarpine is shown to be just as effective as apraclonidine in preventing intraocular pressure spikes after laser trabeculoplasty.

=== Presbyopia ===
In 2021, the US Food and Drug Administration (FDA) approved pilocarpine hydrochloride as an eye drop treatment for presbyopia, age-related difficulty with near-in vision. It works by causing the pupils to constrict, increasing depth of field, similar to the effect of pinhole glasses.

=== Other ===
Pilocarpine is used to stimulate sweat glands in a sweat test to measure the concentration of chloride and sodium that is excreted in sweat. It is used to diagnose cystic fibrosis.

== Adverse effects ==
Use of pilocarpine may result in a range of adverse effects, most of them related to its non-selective action as a muscarinic receptor agonist. Systemic (oral) pilocarpine has been known to cause excessive salivation, sweating, bronchial mucus secretion, bronchospasm, bradycardia, vasodilation, and diarrhea. Eye drops can result in brow ache and chronic use in miosis. It can also cause temporary blurred vision or darkness of vision, temporary shortsightedness, hyphema and retinal detachment.

== Pharmacology ==
Pilocarpine is a drug that acts as a muscarinic receptor agonist. It acts on a subtype of muscarinic receptor (M_{3}) found on the iris sphincter muscle, causing the muscle to contract – resulting in pupil constriction (miosis). Pilocarpine also acts on the ciliary muscle and causes it to contract. When the ciliary muscle contracts, it opens the trabecular meshwork through increased tension on the scleral spur. This action facilitates the rate that aqueous humor leaves the eye to decrease intraocular pressure. Paradoxically, when pilocarpine induces this ciliary muscle contraction (known as an accommodative spasm) it causes the eye's lens to thicken and move forward within the eye. This movement causes the iris (which is located immediately in front of the lens) to also move forward, narrowing the anterior chamber angle. Narrowing of the anterior chamber angle increases the risk of increased intraocular pressure.

== Society and culture ==
=== Preparation ===
Plants in the genus Pilocarpus are the only known sources of pilocarpine, and commercial production is derived entirely from the leaves of Pilocarpus microphyllus (Maranham Jaborandi). This genus grows only in South America, and Pilocarpus microphyllus is native to several states in northern Brazil.

Pilocarpine is extracted from the leaves of Pilocarpus microphyllus in a multi-step process: the sample is moistened with dilute sodium hydroxide to transform the alkaloid into its free-base form then extracted using chloroform or a suitable organic solvent. Pilocarpine can then be further purified by re-extracting the resulting solution with aqueous sulfuric acid then readjusting the pH to basic using ammonia and a final extraction by chloroform.

It can also be synthesized from 2-ethyl-3-carboxy-2-butyrolactone in an eight-step process from the acyl chloride (by treatment with thionyl chloride) via a Arndt–Eistert reaction with diazomethane then by treatment with potassium phthalimide and potassium thiocyanate.

=== Brand names ===
Pilocarpine is available under several brand names such as: Diocarpine (Dioptic), Isopto Carpine (Alcon), Miocarpine (CIBA Vision), Ocusert Pilo-20 and -40 (Alza), Pilopine HS (Alcon), Salagen (MGI Pharma), Scheinpharm Pilocarpine (Schein Pharmaceutical), Timpilo (Merck Frosst), and Vuity (AbbVie).

== Research ==
Pilocarpine is used to induce chronic epilepsy in rodents, commonly rats, as a means to study the disorder's physiology and to examine different treatments. Smaller doses may be used to induce salivation in order to collect samples of saliva, for instance, to obtain information about IgA antibodies.
