= Descemet membrane endothelial keratoplasty =

Method of corneal transplantation

Descemet membrane endothelial keratoplasty (DMEK) is a method of corneal transplantation that involves the removal of a thin sheet of tissue from the posterior (innermost) side of a person's cornea to replace it with the two posterior (innermost) layers of corneal tissue from a donor's eyeball.

The two exchanged corneal layers are the Descemet's membrane and the corneal endothelium. The person's corneal tissue is gently excised, peeled off, and replaced with the donor tissue via small 'clear corneal incisions' (small corneal incisions just anterior to the corneal limbus. The donor tissue is tamponaded against the person's exposed posterior corneal stroma by injecting a small air bubble into the anterior chamber. To ensure the air tamponade is effective, people must maintain such a posture that they look up at the ceiling during recovery until the air bubble has fully resorbed.

== Medical uses ==
Indications for DMEK include:

- Corneal dystrophy involving the corneal endothelial layer, e.g.:
  - Fuchs' endothelial dystrophy
  - Posterior polymorphous corneal dystrophy
- Pseudophakic bullous keratopathy
- Iridocorneal endothelial syndrome

== Nomenclature ==
A minor variation to DMEK is the Descemet Membrane Automated Endothelial Keratoplasty (DMAEK), which involves automated donor tissue preparation using a microkeratome or femtosecond laser.

== See also ==
- Corneal transplantation#Endothelial keratoplasty
- Corneal transplantation#DSEK/DSAEK/DMEK
