= Krukenberg's spindle =

Eye disorder symptom

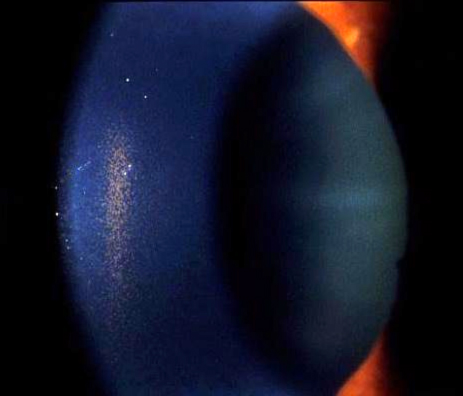
- Slit lamp photograph showing Krukenberg's Spindle as pigment cell deposits on the cornea
- Specialty: Ophthalmology

Krukenberg's spindle is the name given to the pattern formed on the inner surface of the cornea by pigmented iris cells that are shed during the mechanical rubbing of the posterior pigment layer of the iris with the zonules that are deposited as a result of the currents of the aqueous humor. The sign was described in 1899 by Friedrich Ernst Krukenberg (1871–1946), who was a German pathologist specialising in ophthalmology.

== Diagnosis ==
=== Differential diagnosis ===
==== Iritis ====
- Painful red eye with photophobia associated with inflammation

==== Vortex keratopathy ====
- Corneal deposits also known as cornea verticillata, caused by netarsudil eye drops or chronic amiodarone use for cardiac arrhythmias.

==== Corneal guttata ====
- Non-transparent collagen deposits appearing following loss of corneal endothelial cells

== See also ==
- Pigment dispersion syndrome
