= Methazolamide =

Chemical compound

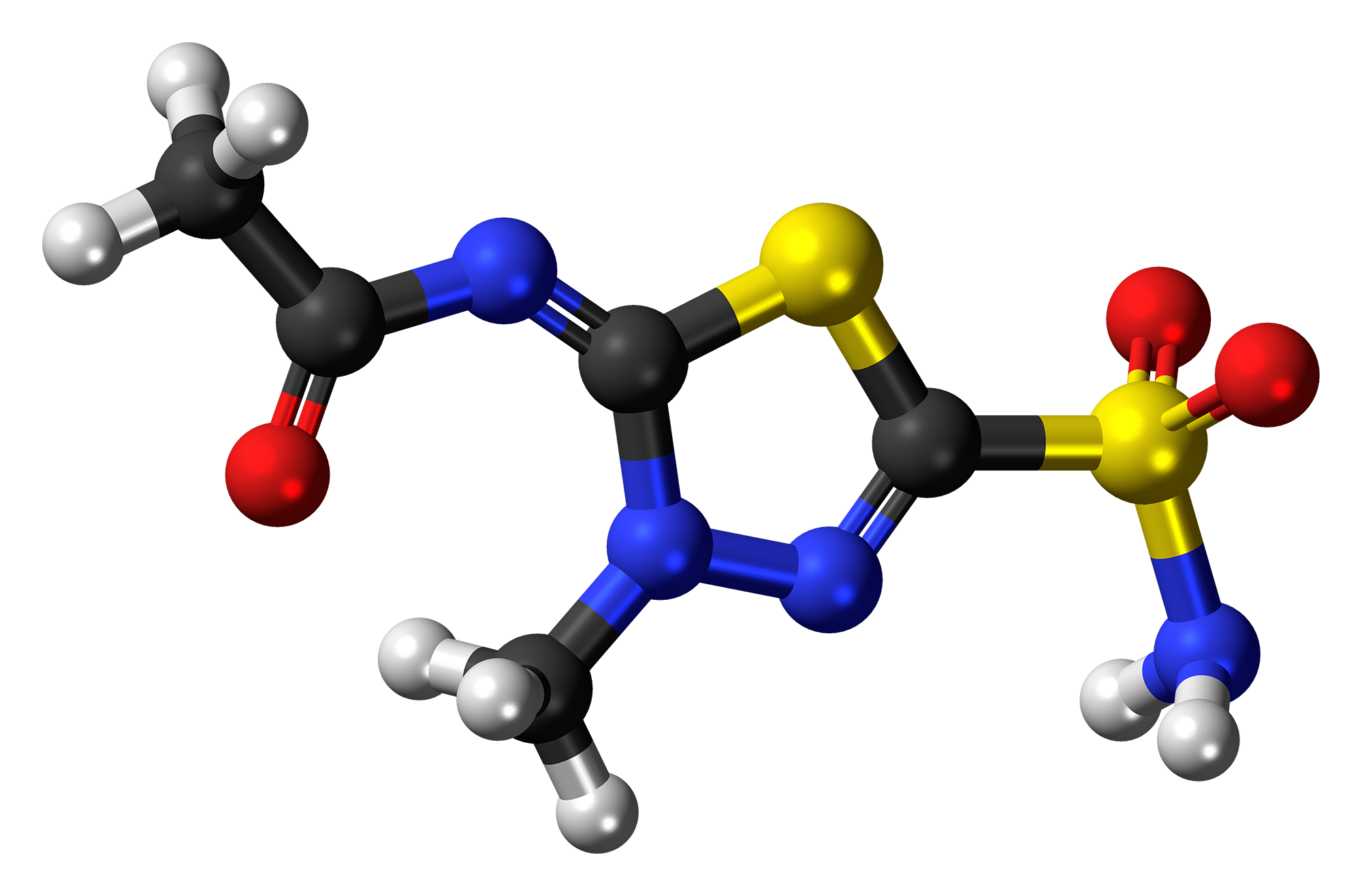

Clinical data
- Other names: N-(3-Methyl-5-sulfamoyl-3H-1,3,4-thiadiazol-2-ylidene) ethanamide
- AHFS/Drugs.com: Monograph
- MedlinePlus: a601233
- Routes of administration: Oral
- ATC code: S01EC05 (WHO)

Legal status
- Legal status: US: ℞-only

Pharmacokinetic data
- Protein binding: ~55%
- Elimination half-life: ~14 hours

Identifiers
- IUPAC name: N-[5-(aminosulfonyl)-3-methyl-1,3,4-thiadiazol-2(3H)-ylidene]acetamide
- CAS Number: 554-57-4
- PubChem CID: 4100
- IUPHAR/BPS: 6828
- DrugBank: DB00703
- ChemSpider: 3958
- UNII: W733B0S9SD
- KEGG: D00655
- ChEMBL: ChEMBL19
- CompTox Dashboard (EPA): DTXSID1023281
- ECHA InfoCard: 100.008.243

Chemical and physical data
- Formula: C_{5}H_{8}N_{4}O_{3}S_{2}
- Molar mass: 236.26 g·mol^{−1}
- 3D model (JSmol): Interactive image
- SMILES: O=S(=O)(C\1=N\N(C(=N/C(=O)C)/S/1)C)N
- InChI: InChI=1S/C5H8N4O3S2/c1-3(10)7-4-9(2)8-5(13-4)14(6,11)12/h1-2H3,(H2,6,11,12)/b7-4-; Key:FLOSMHQXBMRNHR-DAXSKMNVSA-N

Methazolamide (trade name Neptazane) is a potent carbonic anhydrase inhibitor. It is indicated in the treatment of increased intraocular pressure (IOP) in chronic open-angle glaucoma and secondary glaucoma. Also it is used preoperatively in acute angle-closure (narrow-angle) glaucoma where lowering the IOP is desired before surgery.

This drug has displayed teratogenic effects in rats. Compared to another drug in the same class, acetazolamide, methazolamide requires a lower dose when administered to patients.

Recently, research has also uncovered a potential new role for this drug, addressing tau toxicity, a theorized cause for diseases such as Alzheimer’s.
