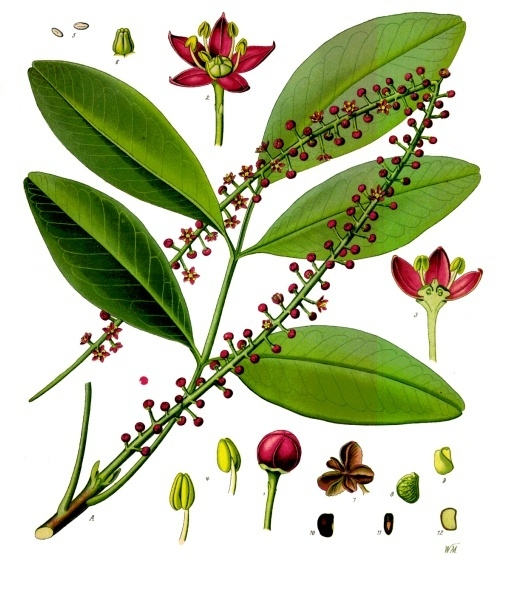
- Paraguay Jaborandi (Pilocarpus pennatifolius)

Scientific classification
- Kingdom: Plantae
- Clade: Tracheophytes
- Clade: Angiosperms
- Clade: Eudicots
- Clade: Rosids
- Order: Sapindales
- Family: Rutaceae
- Subfamily: Zanthoxyloideae
- Genus: Pilocarpus; Vahl

Species
- See text.

= Pilocarpus =

Genus of flowering plants

Pilocarpus is a genus of about 13 species of plants belonging to the family Rutaceae, native to the Neotropics of South America. Various species are important pharmacologically as a source of the parasympathomimetic alkaloid pilocarpine. Many of the species have the common name jaborandi.

== Etymology ==
The taxonomic name Pilocarpus is derived from ancient Greek πῖλος wool, felt + καρπός fruit.

== Species ==
Selected species

- Pilocarpus goudotianus Tul.
- Pilocarpus jaborandi (Pernambuco jaborandi)
- Pilocarpus microphyllus (Maranham jaborandi)
- Pilocarpus racemosus (Guadeloupe jaborandi)
- Pilocarpus pennatifolius (Paraguay jaborandi)
- Pilocarpus spicatus (Aracati jaborandi)
