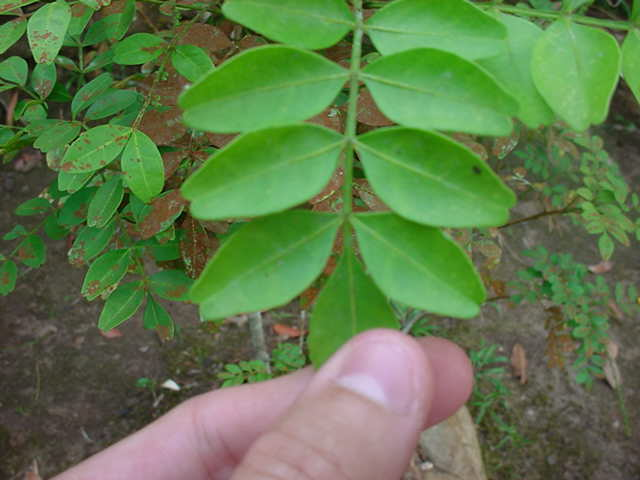

Scientific classification
- Kingdom: Plantae
- Clade: Tracheophytes
- Clade: Angiosperms
- Clade: Eudicots
- Clade: Rosids
- Order: Sapindales
- Family: Rutaceae
- Genus: Pilocarpus
- Species: P. microphyllus

Binomial name
- Pilocarpus microphyllus Stapf ex Wardlew.

= Pilocarpus microphyllus =

Species of flowering plant

Pilocarpus microphyllus, the Maranham jaborandi, is a plant species in the genus Pilocarpus found native to several states in northern Brazil.

Commercial production of the alkaloid muscarinic receptor agonist pilocarpine is derived entirely from the leaves of the shrub.
