= Anterior chamber of eyeball =

Space in the eye

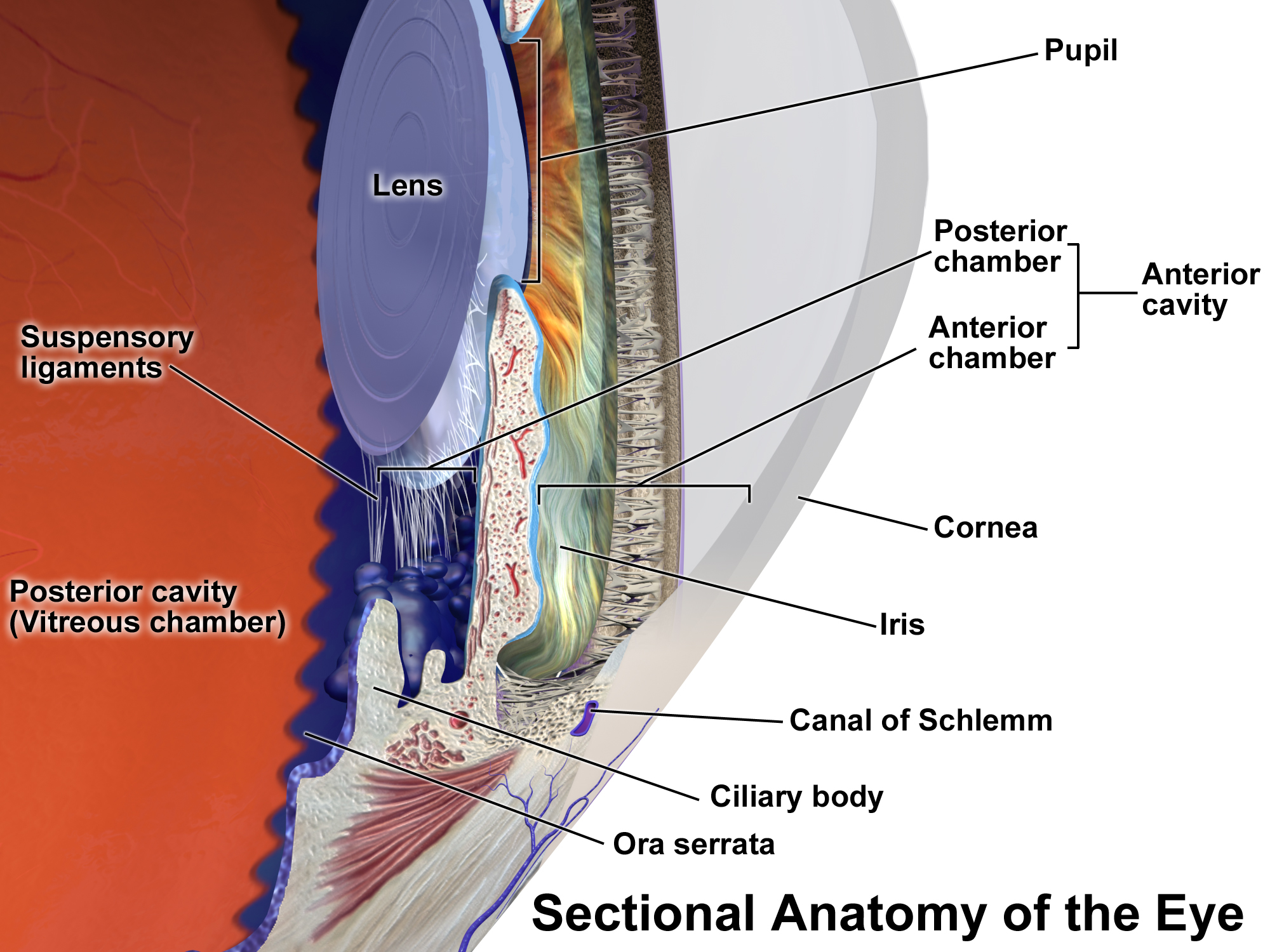
- Anterior part of human eye, with anterior chamber at right.

- Schematic diagram of the human eye.

Details

Identifiers
- Latin: camera anterior bulbi oculi
- Acronym(s): AC
- MeSH: D000867
- TA98: A15.2.06.003
- TA2: 6792
- FMA: 58078

The anterior chamber (AC) is the aqueous humor-filled space inside the eye between the iris and the cornea's innermost surface, the endothelium. Hyphema, anterior uveitis and glaucoma are three main pathologies in this area. In hyphema, blood fills the anterior chamber as a result of a hemorrhage, most commonly after a blunt eye injury. Anterior uveitis is an inflammatory process affecting the iris and ciliary body, with resulting inflammatory signs in the anterior chamber. In glaucoma, blockage of the trabecular meshwork prevents the normal outflow of aqueous humour, resulting in increased intraocular pressure, progressive damage to the optic nerve head, and eventually blindness.

The depth of the anterior chamber of the eye varies between 1.5 and 4.0 mm, averaging 3.0 mm. It tends to become shallower at older age and in eyes with hypermetropia (far sightedness). As depth decreases below 2.5 mm, the risk for angle closure glaucoma increases.

== Clinical significance ==
=== Depth measurement ===
Determining the anterior chamber depth (ACD) is important in estimating the risk of angle closure glaucoma. There are various methods of measuring ACD, including examination through a slit lamp, ultrasound and Scheimpflug photography. These methods require sophisticated examination equipment and expertise.

A simpler clinical method of quantitatively estimating ACD using smartphone photography (EZ ratio) was developed by Dr Ehud Zamir from the Centre for Eye Research Australia, the University of Melbourne, and published in 2016.

==== EZ ratio method ====
The EZ ratio method is one way to calculate the estimated anterior chamber depth. To start, the patient looks at a target in the distance with one eye covered. The examiner takes a digital photograph of the open, examined eye, from the side, perpendicular to the visual axis (a profile photograph).

The following parameters then need to be measured in the photograph, using a personal computer or a smartphone (figures 1,2):

1. The pixel distance between the limbus (the junction between clear cornea and white sclera) and the front of the cornea. This distance is referred to as Z.

2. The pixel distance between the limbus and the centre of the pupil. This distance is referred to as E.

E:Z ratio is the arithmetic ratio between E and Z.

This ratio is linearly correlated with the depth of the anterior chamber with the following equation:

Anterior chamber depth (expressed in millimetres) = -3.3 x EZ ratio + 4.2

This estimate has been shown to be accurate with a 95% confidence interval of +/– 0.33 mm error, when compared to measurements of the anterior chamber depth by Scheimpflug photography.

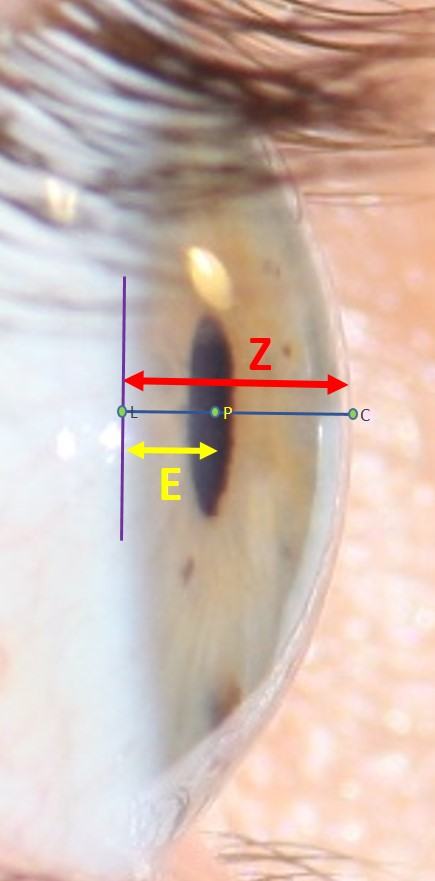
Figure 1. Calculating EZ ratio.

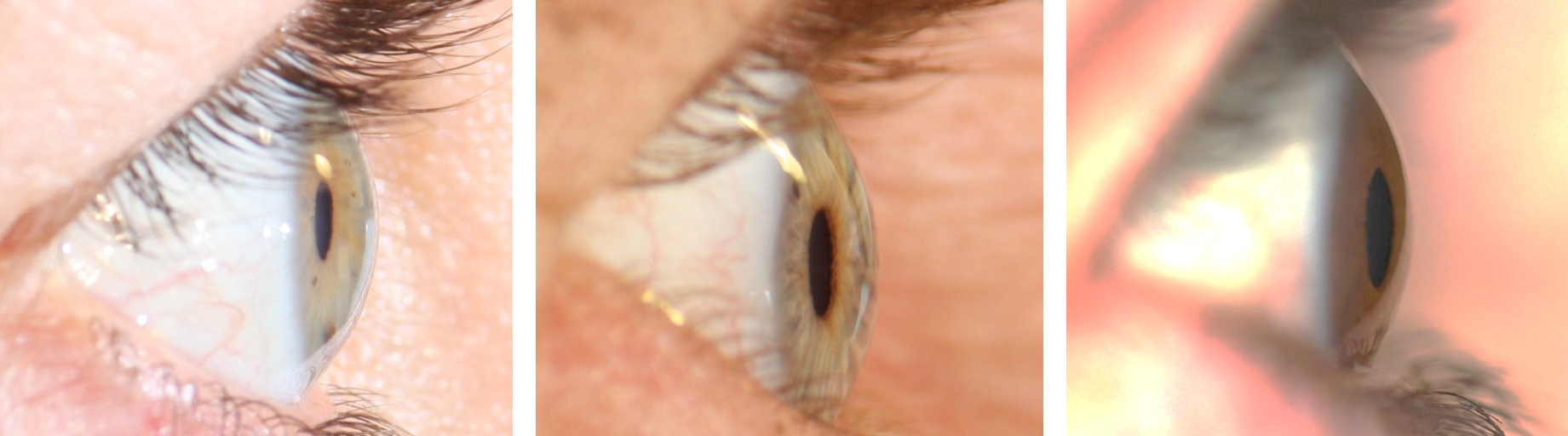
Figure 2. Different anterior chamber depths as seen from the lateral perpendicular (profile) view. The more forward the pupil is, the shallower the anterior chamber. In the leftmost photo, the pupil is relatively posterior (set back), indicating an EZ ratio of < 0.5 and an anterior chamber deeper than 2.5 mm. In the middle photo, the pupil is midway between the sclera posteriorly and the cornea anteriorly, indicating an EZ ratio of 0.5, and a medium chamber depth of about 2.5 mm. In the rightmost photo, the pupil is very anterior (forward), indicating an EZ ratio of more than 0.5 and a shallow anterior chamber of less than 2.5 mm.

=== Associated immune deviation ===
One peculiar feature of the anterior chamber is dampened immune response to allogenic grafts. This is called anterior chamber associated immune deviation (ACAID), a term introduced in 1981 by Streilein et al. This phenomenon is relevant to the fact that the eye is considered an "immune privileged site", like the brain and the testis.

== Pathology ==
- Glaucoma
- Hyphema
- Hypopyon
- Intraocular pressure
- Ocular hypertension

== Additional images ==
Gonioscopy of the anterior chamber angle

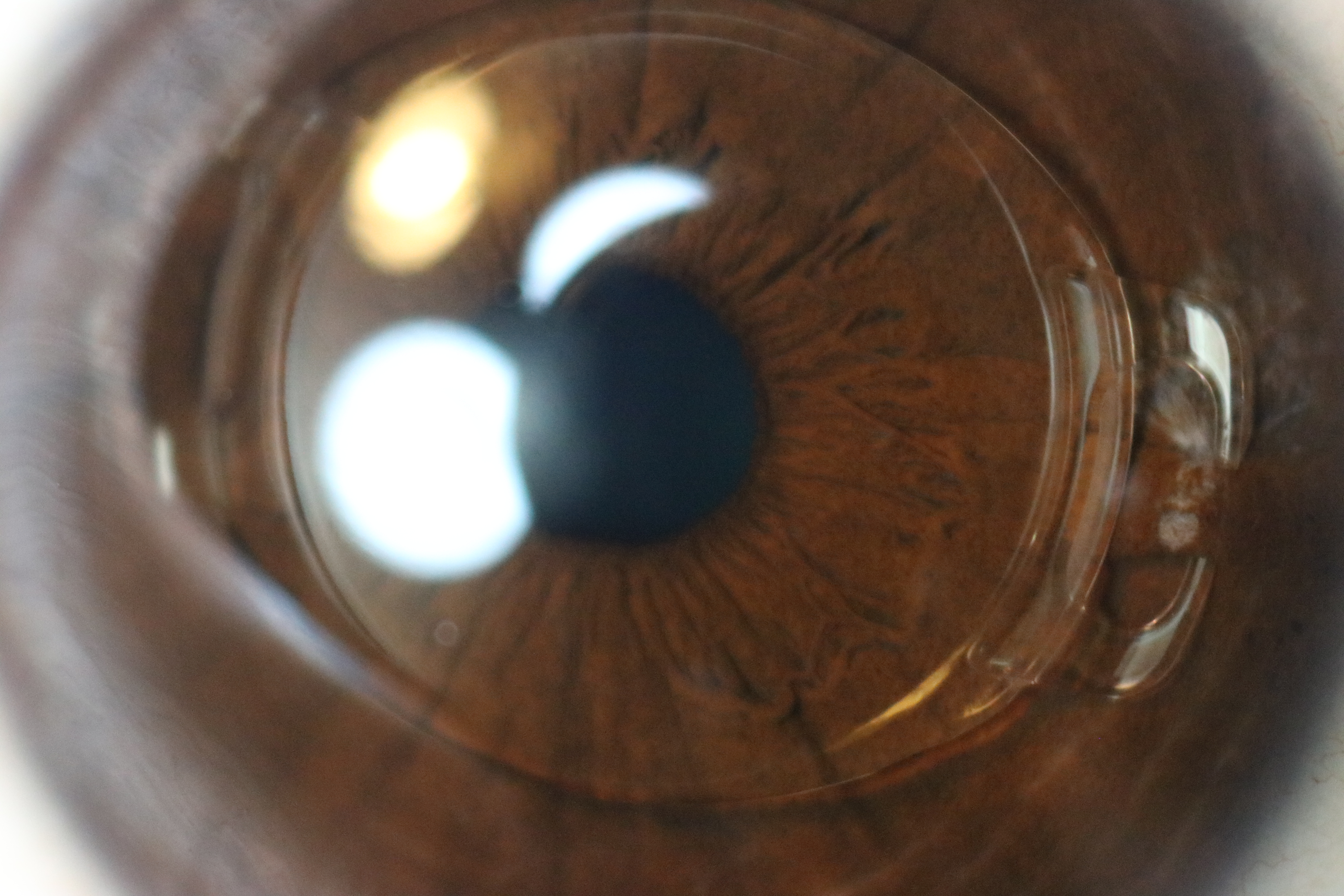
Anterior chamber IOL

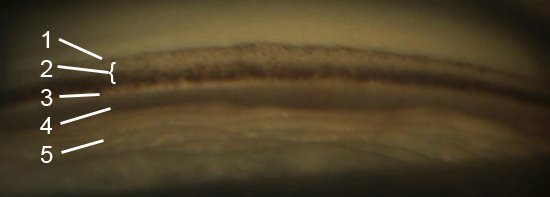
Gonioscopy of the anterior chamber angle. Labeled structures: 1. Schwalbe's line, 2. Trabecular meshwork (TM), 3. Scleral spur, 4. Ciliary body, 5. Iris

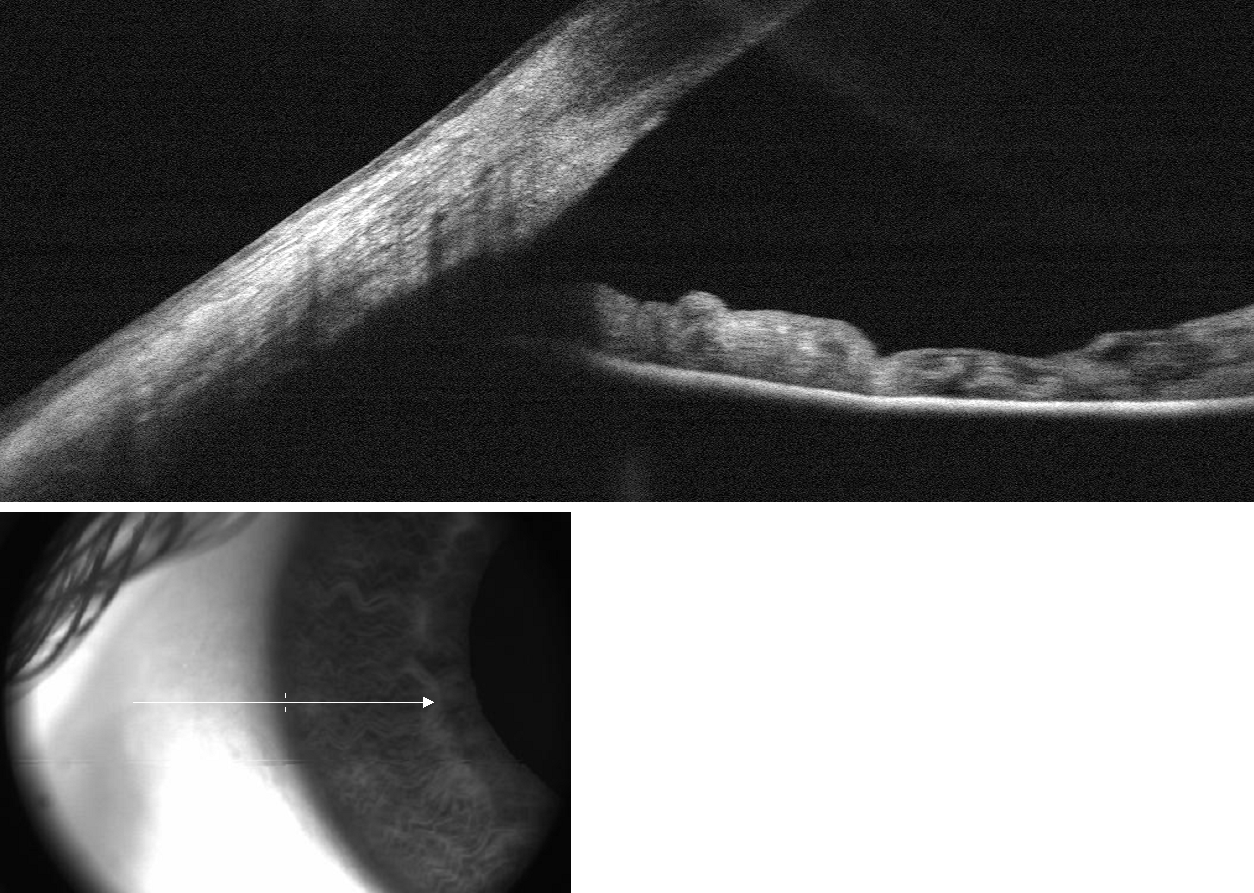
Anterior chamber angle cross-section imaged by an SD-OCT.

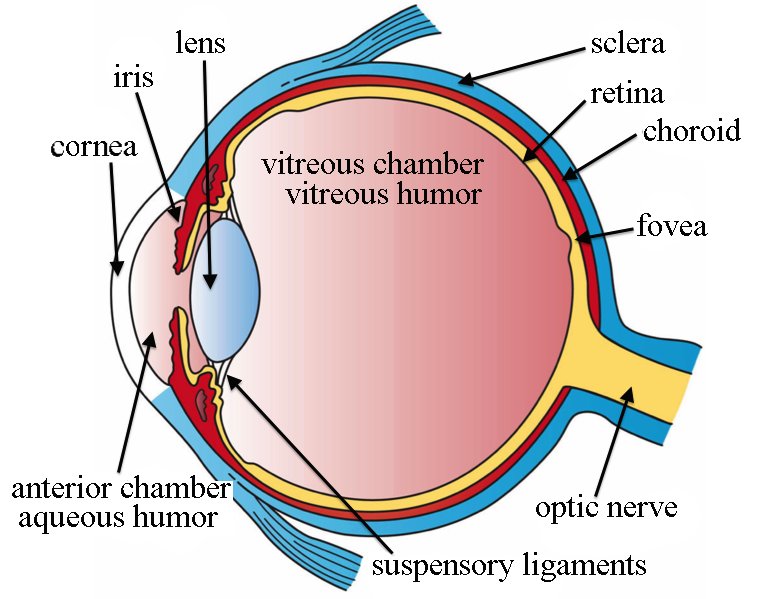
Labeled views of the structures of the eye

== See also ==
- Anterior segment
- Anterior chamber IOL (phakic IOL)
- Anterior chamber paracentesis
