= Pigment dispersion syndrome =

Accumulation of pigment cells within the eye's internal fluid

- Other names: Pigmentary glaucoma
- The iris(cells) plays a role in this condition
- Specialty: Ophthalmology
- Medication: Latanaprost (eye drops)

In ophthalmology, pigment dispersion syndrome (PDS) is an eye disorder that can lead to a form of glaucoma known as pigmentary glaucoma. It takes place when pigment cells slough off from the back of the iris and float around in the aqueous humor. Over time, these pigment cells can accumulate in the anterior chamber in such a way that they begin to clog the trabecular meshwork (the major site of aqueous humour drainage), which can in turn prevent the aqueous humour from draining and therefore increases the pressure inside the eye. A common finding in PDS are central, vertical corneal endothelial pigment deposits, known as Krukenberg spindle. With PDS, the intraocular pressure tends to spike at times and then can return to normal. Exercise has been shown to contribute to spikes in pressure as well. When the pressure is great enough to cause damage to the optic nerve, this is called pigmentary glaucoma. As with all types of glaucoma, when damage happens to the optic nerve fibers, the vision loss that occurs is irreversible and painless.

== Risk factors ==
This condition is rare, but occurs most often in Caucasians, particularly men, and the age of onset is relatively low: mid 20s to 40s. As the crystalline lens hardens with age, the lens zonules pull away from the iris and the syndrome lessens and stops. The main risk factor is nearsightedness. Genetic factors may also play a part in the transition from syndrome to the glaucoma condition.

== Diagnosis ==
Diagnosis for pigment dispersion syndrome is made with characteristic slit lamp and gonioscopy findings.

== Management ==
There is no cure, but pigmentary glaucoma can be managed with eye drops or treated with simple surgeries. If caught early and monitored, chances of glaucoma are greatly reduced.

A 2016 Cochrane Review sought to determine the effectiveness of YAG laser iridotomy versus no laser iridotomy for pigment dispersion syndrome and pigmentary glaucoma, in 195 participants, across five studies. No clear benefits in preventing loss of visual field were found for eyes treated with peripheral laser iridotomy. There was weak evidence suggesting that laser iridotomy could be more effective in lowering intraocular pressure in eyes versus no treatment.
