= J. Wayne Streilein =

- Born: June 19, 1935; Johnstown, Pennsylvania
- Died: March 15, 2004 (aged 68); Boston, Massachusetts
- Education: University of Pennsylvania School of Medicine, MD, 1960
- Known for: "The Father of Modern Ocular Immunology"
- Scientific career
- Fields: Immunology; Ophthalmology; Dermatology
- Workplaces: Harvard Medical School

J. Wayne Streilein (Johnstown, Pennsylvania, June 19, 1935 – March 15, 2004) was a scientist whose main area of research was the ocular immune system. He is known particularly for studying the mechanisms that keep the cornea avascular despite the inflammatory and other stimuli that usually promote small blood vessel ingrowth; these peculiar corneal mechanisms provide the basis for what is known as the "corneal antiangiogenic privilege".

== Books ==
- Immunology: A Programmed Text by Wayne J. Streilein (Hardcover – May 1977)
- Kaplan, Henry S.; J. Wayne Streilein; Jerry Y. Niederkorn (2007). Immune Response and the Eye (Chemical Immunology). S. Karger AG (Switzerland). ISBN 978-3-8055-8187-5.
- Immune Privilege, Sites, Tissues, Strategies and Diseases (Medical Intelligence Unit Series) by J. Wayne Streilein (Hardcover – Jan 1997)
