= Anterior chamber angle =

Part of eye

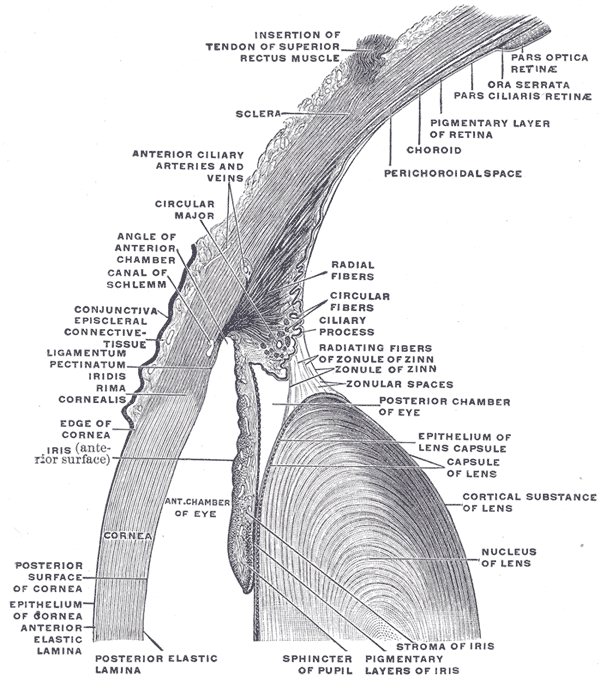
- The upper half of a sagittal section through the front of the eyeball (anterior chamber angle is labeled at center left)

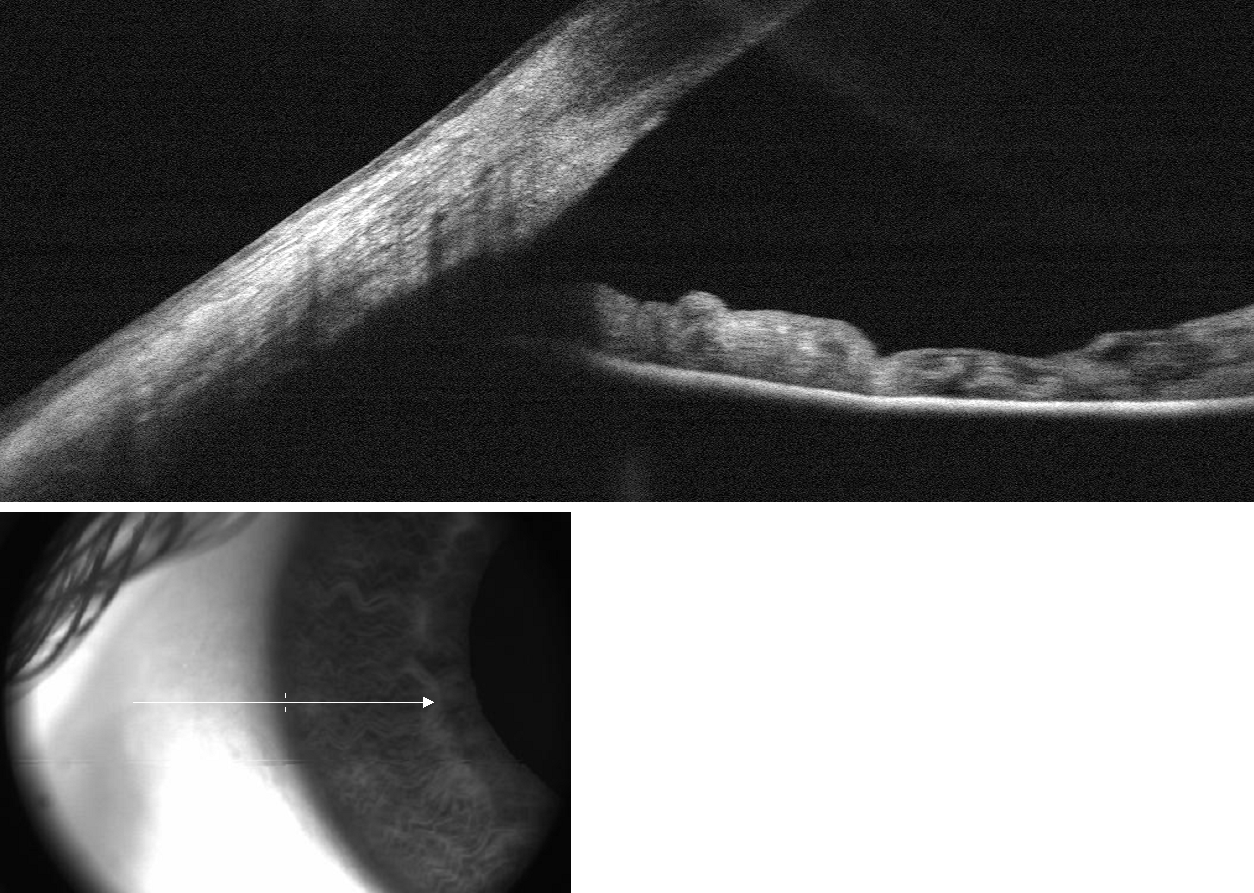
- Anterior chamber angle cross-section imaged by an SD-OCT.

Details

Identifiers
- Latin: angulus iridocornealis
- TA98: A15.2.06.004
- TA2: 6793
- FMA: 58577

The anterior chamber angle is a part of the eye located between the cornea and iris which contains the trabecular meshwork. The size of this angle is an important determinant of the rate aqueous humour flows out of the eye, and thus, the intraocular pressure. The anterior chamber angle is the structure which determines the anterior chamber depth. An extremely narrow anterior chamber angle is a feature of angle closure glaucoma.

== Additional images ==
Gonioscopy of the anterior chamber angle

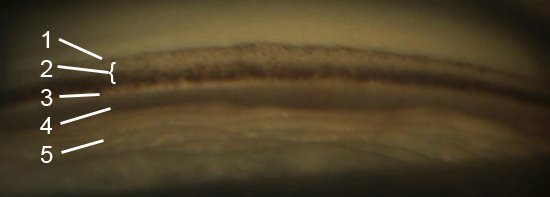
Gonioscopy of the anterior chamber angle. Labeled structures: 1. Schwalbe's line, 2. Trabecular meshwork (TM), 3. Scleral spur, 4. Ciliary body, 5. Iris

== See also ==
- Van Herick technique
