= Phacolytic glaucoma =

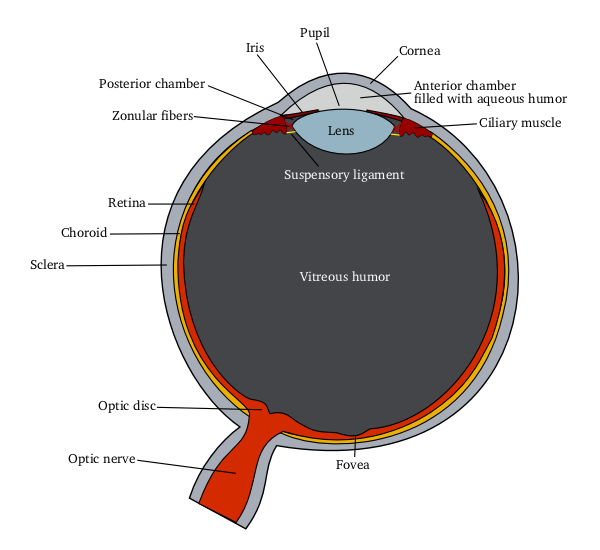
- Anatomy of the eye
- Specialty: Ophthalmology
- Differential diagnosis: Phacomorphic glaucoma

Phacolytic glaucoma (PG) is a form of glaucoma which is caused due to a leaking mature or immature cataract. Inflammatory glaucoma which occurs in phacolysis is a condition which is a result of the leakage of protein within the lens into the capsule of a mature or hyper mature cataract and involves a simple procedure to be cured that is referred to as cataract extraction.

The main symptoms of glaucoma include pain in the eye, redness and loss of sight, all of which reduce an individual's independence, in turn, reducing quality of life and an individual's ability to fulfill other societal roles (such as driving and reading) as it reduces visual clarity. Phacolysis tends to be more frequently reported in underdeveloped countries because of the lack of resources necessary to treat such as condition.

== Signs and symptoms ==
There are a variety of characteristics which indicate that an individual may have phacolytic glaucoma. Within older people, the lens of the eye may appear to be yellow and lose its transparency (becomes cloudy). Once the protein begins to seep into the lens, permanent damage to the lens may be caused as the precipitate in lens impairs vision.

Another symptom includes the fading of visual clarity. This symptom makes the eye create an image commonly described to appear as though looking through a waterfall. If the lens becomes completely opaque the individual will become blind, even though the photoreceptor cells are completely functional. Other common symptoms include;

- clouding of the eyes natural lens
- increase in intraocular pressure, which lies behind the iris and the pupil
- red eyes
- acute onset pain
- tearing
- corneal edema
- photophobia (experience of discomfort to the eyes because of the exposure of high levels of light or by presence of physical sensitivity within the eyes)
- significantly decreased vision.

The major influencers of this illness include high exposure to the sun and age as this is a rare condition for individuals under the age of 35.

== Causes ==
Cataracts, if left untreated, can develop into a mature state or hyper mature state, and may progressively become leaky thereby excreting proteins. Cataracts are caused by a breakdown of proteins which allows the lens to become cloudy and gradually turn opaque, causing a decrease in vision. Through the leakage of proteins that have a high molecular weight an obstruction of the drainage mechanism of the eye is caused.

== Diagnosis ==
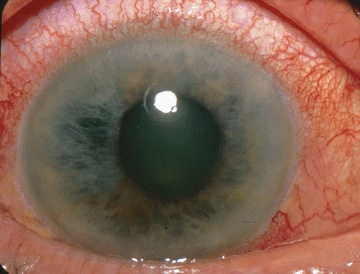
Lens of the eye becomes cloudy once affected by the cataract.

A variety of procedures can be used to physically diagnose phacolytic glaucoma as there are a variety of other types of glaucoma which may be confused with phacolysis such as acute angle-closure glaucoma (AACG), lens-particle glaucoma, neovascular glaucoma, phacomorphic glaucoma and uveitic glaucoma which can cause confusion in which procedures need to be conducted to revamp vision.

The first type of diagnostic procedure referred to as a 'slit lamp examination' of phacolytic glaucoma allows for specific identification of microcystic corneal edema and the presence of macrophages, white material (dotted with patches within the inside capsule of the lens) and intense flare and iridescent or hyper-refringent particles specific to phacolytic glaucoma. The time period which symptoms have been affecting the patient should be obtained as experiencing symptoms for a period longer than 5 days may result in further issues such as glaucomatous disc damage or poorer prognosis. Additionally, previous cataract or trauma surgery which have been conducted must be accounted for so that an accurate diagnosis of current symptoms which could be caused because of these previous experiences.

An ophthalmologic examination is another procedure which must be conducted to effectively diagnose phacolytic glaucoma. This test will indicate high levels of inflammation due to high intraocular pressures within the eyes. Additionally, the presence of calcium oxalate and cholesterol crystals from the degenerating cataract lens is an indication of phacolytic glaucoma but can only be identified by puncturing the cataract. This is specifically used to differentiate between uveitic glaucoma where keratic precipitates are present rather than calcium oxalate.

=== Target Population ===
Phacolysis is evident, more commonly, within elderly people as a result of cataracts that have developed over time. There are other factors which contribute to the development of phacolysis in seniors. This is clearly indicated through the increase of intraocular pressure, which usually occurs when anterior flow faces obstruction of the anterior flow to the aqueous humor. Essentially, the eye requires a photosynthetic pigment which allows for light to become chemical energy. Within seniors, this pigment over time splits with the oxygen to thereby generate phacolysis.

== Treatment ==
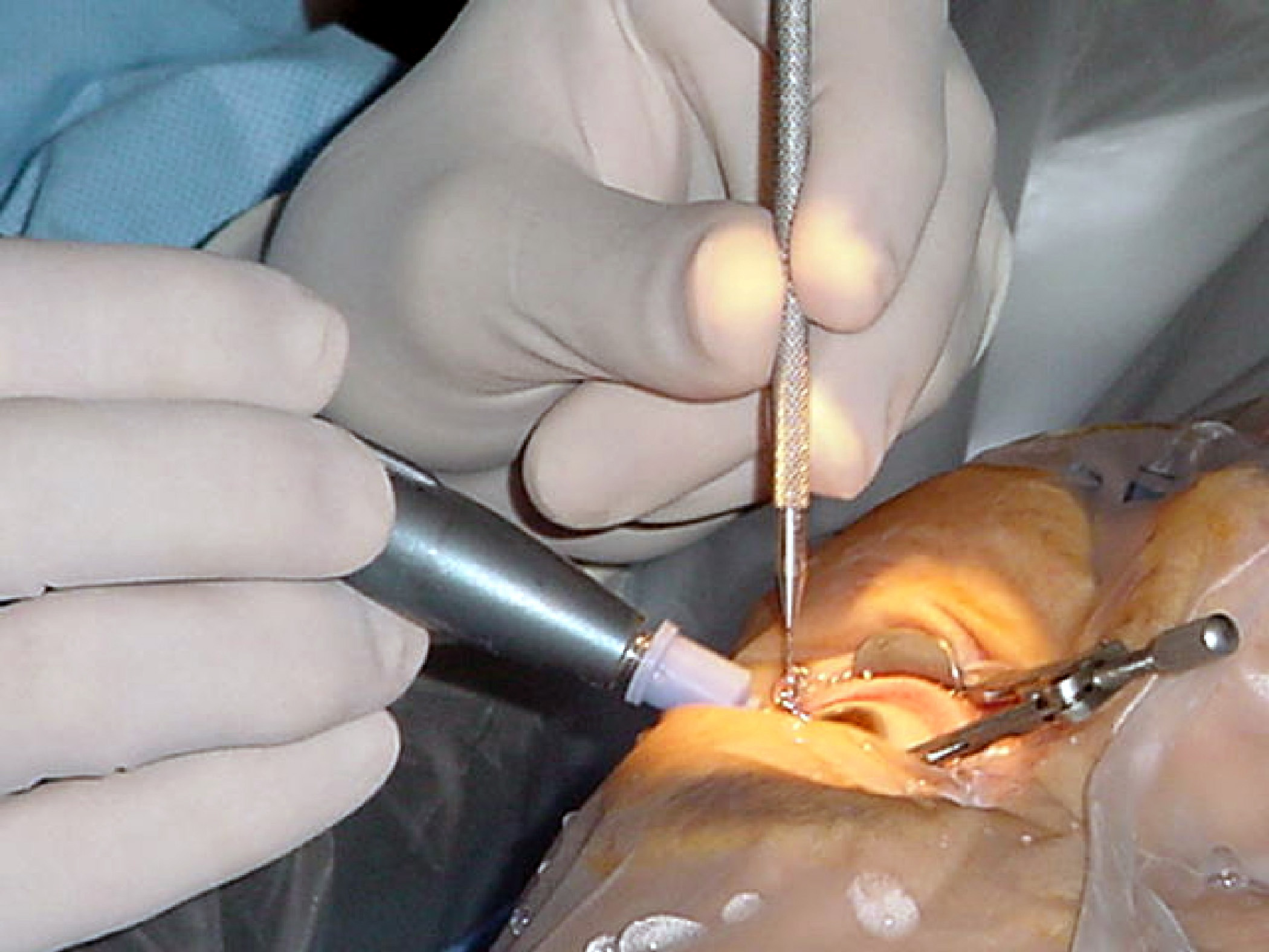
Medical procedure being conducted to treat Phacolysis.

The procedure involved in the curing of phacolysis includes the reduction of intraocular pressure (IOP) in the eye followed by cataract extraction surgery. Medical management is commonly used simply to control the inflammation temporarily. The reduction of intraocular pressure can be conducted through the use of a combination of topical and systemic IOP-lowering agents, cycloplegics, aqueous suppressants, hyper-osmotic agents, and anti-inflammatory drugs. Topical steroids also may assist in lowering intraocular pressure and decreasing pain.

Previous to cataract surgery a variety of optometrical tests have to be conducted to comprehensively analyse an individual's eye-sight prior to the surgery. A refraction is also conducted to determine how much nearsightedness, farsightedness and/or astigmatism an individual may have. Additional specific measurements of the eye will be necessary in order to determine the curvature and length of the cornea in order to choose the most effective IOL which will need to be inserted during the surgery.

Cataract surgery has become a very simple process which, with modern-day technology, can be conducted in a local anaesthetic procedure in an average time period of 15 minutes. The aim of cataract surgery is to replace the lens within the eye with an artificial lens to clear vision while removing any residue which could cloud vision. The cataract extraction surgery involves four major steps which includes; local anaesthetic, clearing of eye, intraocular lens is inserted and finally the contact lens to protect the eye which dissolves releasing antibiotics.

Before major advancements in medical technology, cuts had to be manually made to the lens to conduct cataract extraction surgery, however, with the improvements in technology the LASIK procedure is the main procedure used to conduct cataract surgeries. This procedure involves the use of femtosecond lasers which allow for precision cuts to create the corneal flap necessary to clear the cataract which were substituted for use instead of a surgical tool which is generally hand-held by the surgeon to conduct the same incision manually. The corneal incision, the anterior capsulotomy and lens and cataract fragmentation are steps in which can be an alternative. Within this process, lasers strike a titanium-like target that are attached to an irrigation-aspiration probe. It is said that the utilisation of this laser will enable for better precision, accuracy and reproducibility for the corneal incision, the anterior capsulotomy and lens and cataract, therefore ensuring the reduction of risks and enabling for refined visual development of phacolysis and the extraction of cataract.

When completing the surgery the utilisation of laser cataract surgery will allow for a precise incision resulting in a self-sealing process, enabling for the reduction of infection after the surgery. Therefore, as a result of the advancements in which the laser cataract surgery has provided, regarding the removal of the lens, surgeons have been able to complete the procedure in a more efficient manner and thereby ensure an improvement in the outcomes for individuals suffering from phacolysis. Additionally, the laser cataract procedures which are used to cure phacolysis have a success rate of 98% further proving this procedure's effectiveness.

The main issue with this technology is that the process costs about $300,000 to $500,000 and like all surgical procedures there is a degree of risk. Within the cataract removal procedures which take place a variety of complications may occur including;

- chronic inflammation inside the eye
- retinal detachment
- infection

=== Rehabilitation ===
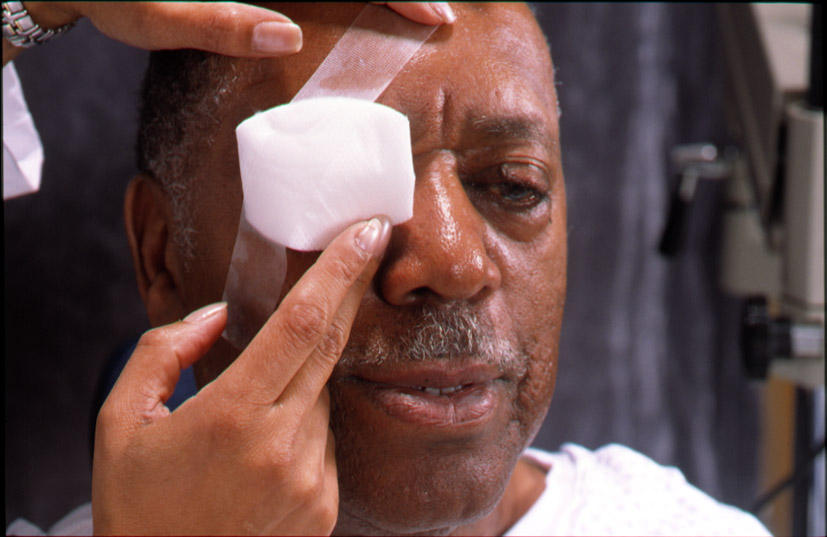
Patient using eyepatch after cataract surgery to reduce the risk of infection.

There are several medications which need to be consumed in order to treat phacolytic glaucoma. The medicines induced ensure the management of glaucoma and reduce inflammation. These medications consist of: Aqueous suppressants, anti-inflammatory drugs, hyper-osmotic agents, cycloplegics, anti-glaucoma medications. Medical therapy, however, is only a temporary treatment until cataract surgery can take place.

The use of an eyepatch for a certain amount of time, as well as a contact lens to protect the eye which dissolves releasing antibiotics, must be incorporated in the rehabilitation process to reduce the risk of infection of the eye and to allow for an effective healing process. Additionally, the patient must consistently visit the specialist in order to ensure a successful removal of phacolytic glaucoma. There may be a need for medical therapies which treat arising issues for the eye such as inflammation. These medical therapy procedures for phacolysis consist of controlling the intraocular pressure which may include the use of topical steroids in order to decrease inflammation in the eye, and mydriatics in order to prevent the formation of synechiae.

=== Medication ===
It is found that with most cases, of phacolytic glaucoma post surgery patients are not exposed to many further obstacles in the healing process which therefore avoids the need for medication. Although, it is mostly encouraged that patients take antiglaucoma medication in order to deter the possibility of glaucoma and inflammation implicating the eye. One of these medications include eye drops which contain prostaglandin analogs. Prostaglandin analogs aim to lower intraocular pressure which thereby avoids inflammation to ensure an efficient healing process after cataract removal. Carbonic anhydrase inhibitors (CAI) in the form of pills, disables the production of the sodium pump in the aqueous humor and thereby decreases inflammation to, in turn, lower intraocular pressure.

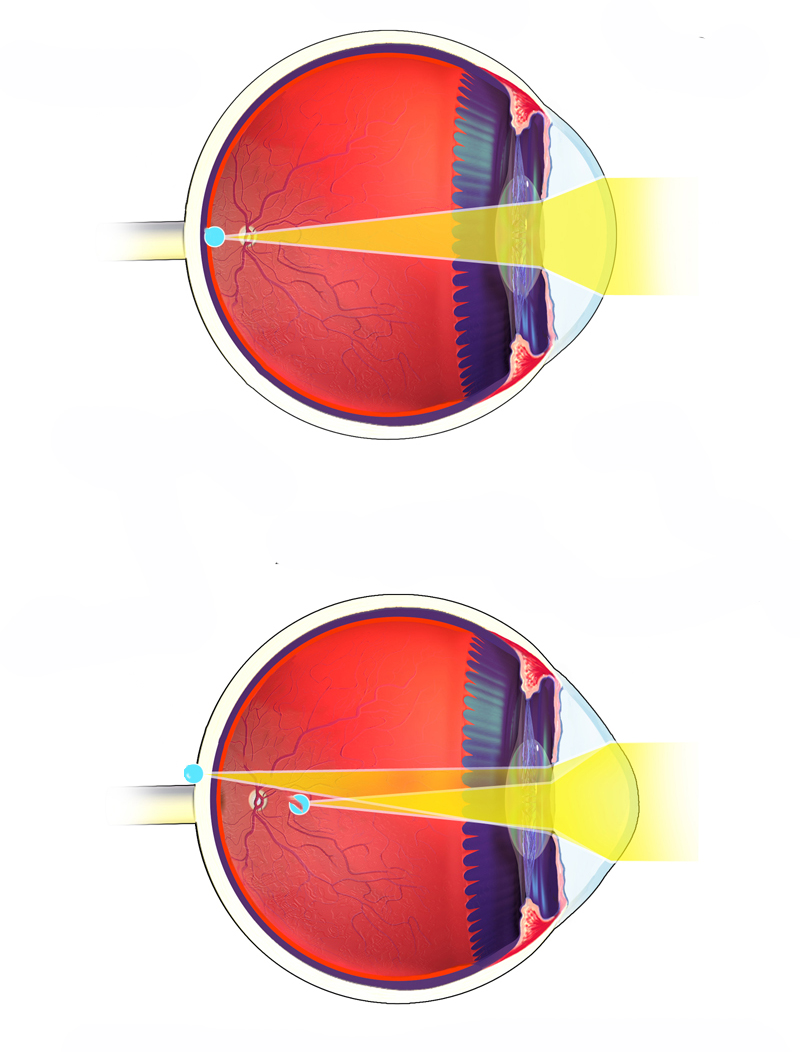
Astigmatism condition.

The only major obstacle which could affect the healing process after the surgery necessary to treat phacolytic glaucoma would be an infection to the eye. The ophthalmologists' conducting the surgery must aim to reduce the amount of microbes which are present on the ocular surface and avoid intracocular contamination during the procedure. These tasks can be conducted through the use of intracameral and topical antibiotics. Intracameral antibiotics are usually injections which are put into the eye or ocular surface to rid of microbes. Topical antibiotics come in the form of tablets which can be consumed through the mouth to treat bacterial infection. The use of either or both are left to the surgeon and their personal opinion on the possibility of bacterial infection.

=== Astigmatism correction ===
Astigmatism involves a deficiency in the optical capacity of the eye whereby the angle of light passing through the eye deviates and becomes distorted visuals due to the light rays, avoiding a common focus. Astigmatisms are the result of the cornea forming more in the shape of a curve in comparison to other meridians. Therefore, in order to reduce this, minor incisions must be taken in place of the cornea which, as previously mentioned, is forming in the shape of a curve, which will flatten the turn to a little extent, thereby allowing the cornea to be rounder and uniform. By performing astigmatism in order to correct the removal of cataract the requirement of prescription glasses and reading glasses post cataract extraction is avoided and ensures better vision for patients. Astigmatism rates increase dramatically from 14.3% in the under 15-year-old age group to 67.2% in the age group of over 65-years old. Since astigmatism affects the population of people over 65-years old which are more likely to suffer from phacolytic glaucoma it is an effective procedure which can take place during the cataract surgery used to correct phacolytic glaucoma and improve the quality of life of sufferers.

== Epidemiology ==
The youngest patient found to be diagnosed with phacolytic glaucoma was 35 years of age, which highlights its significant prevalence in senior patients. Moreover, phacolytic glaucoma is more likely seen in underdeveloped countries as a result of the lack of access to ophthalmologic care. Most cases of phacolytic glaucoma improve when the cataract is extracted, thereby enhancing vision. It is less prevalent in developed countries such as Australia and the United States, due to a greater access to health care and earlier cataract surgery.
