= OCT Biomicroscopy =

Eye imaging technique

- Simulation of an OCT biomicroscopic image of the eye
- Purpose: examination transparent axial tissues of the eye

OCT Biomicroscopy is the use of optical coherence tomography (OCT) in place of slit lamp biomicroscopy to examine the transparent axial tissues of the eye. Traditionally, ophthalmic biomicroscopy has been completed with a slit lamp biomicroscope that uses slit beam illumination and an optical microscope to enable stereoscopic, magnified, cross-sectional views of transparent tissues in the eye, with or without the aid of an additional lens. Like slit lamp biomicroscopy, OCT does not penetrate opaque tissues well but enables detailed, cross-sectional views of transparent tissues, often with greater detail than is possible with a slit lamp. Ultrasound biomicroscopy (UBM) is much better at imaging through opaque tissues since it uses high energy sound waves. Because of its limited depth of penetration, UBM's main use within ophthalmology has been to visualize anterior structures such as the angle and ciliary body. Both ultrasound and OCT biomicroscopy produce an objective image of ocular tissues from which measurements can be made. Unlike UBM, OCT biomicroscopy can image tissues with high axial resolution as far posteriorly as the choroid (Figure 1).

== Rationale ==
Biomicroscopes have been a staple of the ophthalmic examination for nearly a century. The addition of slit beam illumination to a horizontally mounted stereo microscope enables users of a slit lamp biomicroscope to optically 'slice' through transparent tissues in the eye to see them in cross section. Stereoscopic magnification further enables highly detailed inspection of ocular tissues. The use of lenses, such as the Hruby lens, contact lenses or handheld 90D or 78D diopter lenses enables magnified inspection of posterior structures such as the retina.

Despite their relative ubiquity, slit lamps have several important limitations. As optical instruments, conventional slit lamp biomicroscopes do not natively record or document exam findings in the way that imaging devices, such as OCT, MRI or CT, do by storing images. Some modern slit lamps now have the ability to record 2D video or still digital images during an exam. Without any objective record of the exam, findings from slit lamp exams are transient and must be interpreted in real-time by a trained observer. Exam data can be lost if the examiner fails to document a finding or does not have the knowledge required to recognize a finding - a limitation that can be amplified by the variability in ophthalmic training around the world. This requirement that the operator be knowledgeable also means that slit lamp exams must be conducted by trained and experienced personnel - a feature that increases the cost and decreases the number of examiners qualified to perform them. Findings from slit lamp examinations are generally considered to be subjective and qualitative. For example, one ophthalmologist may rate a patient's anterior chamber reaction as 1+ cell with trace flare while a specialist might rate the same patient's anterior chamber reaction as 2+ cell with 2+ flare. Without any objective documentation of the examination findings from that specific visit, it can be difficult to determine in retrospect which assessment was correct. Another limitation of slit lamps is that they must be manually maneuvered during an examination. This freedom means that slit lamp exams may be conducted differently at different patient visits and in different locations around the world. And this variability may have a negative impact on standardization of terminology and exam protocols. Despite these features and limitations, slit lamp exams are still a cornerstone of the ophthalmic exam.

Like slit lamps, OCT imaging devices provide magnified, cross-sectional views of transparent tissues in the eye. Unlike slit lamps, OCT devices store tomographic images that can be 1) acquired consistently using the same protocol at each patient visit in every location around the world, 2) operated by less expensive personnel with less training and experience than a slit lamp, 3) objectively and quantitatively analyzed by the user and/or computer software, and 4) retrospectively or longitudinally assessed in both clinical trials and in clinical practice. At the current time, it is unclear which findings from slit lamp biomicroscopy might be missed with OCT biomicroscopy, and vice versa.

== Technology ==
Until recently, OCT hardware limitations have made OCT biomicroscopy difficult or impossible.

=== Time Domain OCT (TD-OCT) ===
The major limitation of TD-OCT that prevents its use for OCT biomicroscopy is speed. Conventional commercial TD-OCT systems are limited to an acquisition speed of 400 A-scans per second with a depth of 2mm. Assuming that an OCT biomicroscopic system must cover a 15mm x 15mm planar area of eye tissue with an average depth of 24mm (5,400 cubic mm), it would take a conventional TD-OCT system more than one day to capture OCT biomicroscopic data on a single pair of eyes.

=== Spectral Domain OCT (SD-OCT) ===
SD-OCT systems are 50-100x faster than TD-OCT systems and therefore can cover the required tissue volume for OCT biomicroscopy in a single eye in approximately eight minutes (assuming an A-scan rate of 100 kHz). However, commercial SD-OCT systems suffer significant drops in sensitivity, and thus image quality, beyond 2mm of penetration depth. Therefore, if used sequentially to image an eye from the cornea to the choroid, commercial SD-OCT systems would probably produce images with unacceptably inconsistent quality across the depth of the eye. Furthermore, commercial SD-OCT devices also produce mirror image artifacts around the zero delay position. Although this is infrequently distracting in posterior segment imaging, it can be quite confusing when imaging near the iris plane.

=== Swept Source OCT (SS-OCT) ===
The development of short external cavity tunable laser technology has made SS-OCT biomicroscopy possible by combining high speed acquisition with long coherence length and consistently high image quality across the depth of the eye. It is now feasible that properly designed SS-OCT systems could acquire full OCT biomicroscopic data from both eyes of a subject in less than 20 seconds. As with SD-OCT, mirror image artifacts must be removed from SS-OCT systems.

== Exam Components ==
=== Lids, Lashes, Lacrimal Glands ===
Although traditionally used for imaging of the retina and, more recently, the iris and angle of the eye, SS-OCT systems have also been demonstrated to be capable of imaging the lid margins and eyelashes. Although it is possible that future SS-OCT systems might also be capable of imaging a majority of visible eyelid tissue, it is unlikely that OCT biomicroscopic systems will be capable of imaging the lacrimal gland.

=== Conjunctiva ===
High speed SS-OCT systems focused on the anterior segment have been demonstrated to be capable of imaging the bulbar conjunctiva within the palpebral fissure.(see Gora et al.) The remaining bulbar conjunctiva and palpebral conjunctiva cannot currently be imaged while the eyelids are in their natively relaxed position. The use of eyelid retractors as well as eyelid eversion may enable more comprehensive examinations of these conjunctival regions.

=== Cornea ===
In addition to recent work with SS-OCT, (see Gora et al.) numerous investigators have demonstrated the ability of OCT systems to depict pathology within the cornea as well as disorders of corneal topography.
