= Schwalbe's line =

Line of the cornea of the eye

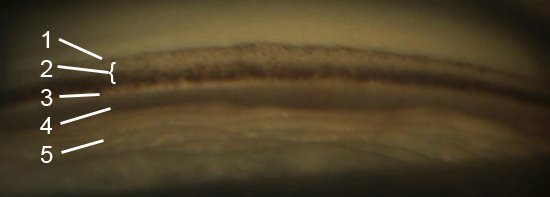
Gonioscopy of the anterior chamber angle. Labeled structures: 1. Schwalbe's line, 2. Trabecular meshwork (TM), 3. Scleral spur, 4. Ciliary body, 5. Iris

Gonioscopy of the anterior chamber angle

Schwalbe's line is the anatomical line found on the interior surface of the eye's cornea, and delineates the outer limit of the corneal endothelium layer. Specifically, it represents the termination of Descemet's membrane. In many cases it can be seen via gonioscopy.

Some evidence suggests that the corneal endothelium actually possesses stem cells that can produce endothelial cells, especially after injury, albeit on a limited scale.
