= Gonioscopy =

Measurement of the angle between an eye's iris and cornea

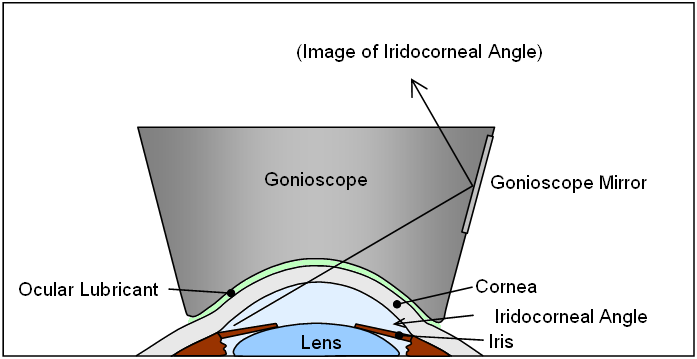
- Goldmann Goniolens schematic
- Specialty: Optometry, ophthalmology
- MeSH: D006068

In ophthalmology, gonioscopy is a routine procedure that measures the angle between the iris and the cornea (the iridocorneal angle), using a goniolens (also known as a gonioscope) together with a slit lamp or operating microscope. Its use is important in diagnosing and monitoring various eye conditions associated with glaucoma.

== The goniolens or gonioscope ==
Gonioscopy enables visualization of the iridocorneal angle using a specialized contact lens with mirrors or prisms, which overcomes total internal reflection at the cornea–air interface that otherwise prevents direct observation of the angle.

The mechanism for this process varies with each type of goniolens. Three examples of goniolenses are the:

- Koeppe direct goniolens: this transparent device is placed directly on the cornea along with lubricating fluid (to avoid damaging its surface). The steeper curvature of this goniolens' exterior surface optically eliminates the total internal reflection problem and allows a view of the iridocorneal angle. Unfortunately it requires the patient to be lying down, and so it cannot be so easily used with an ordinary slit lamp in an optometric environment. In an ophthalmological setting, an operating microscope is one available option.
- Goldmann indirect goniolens: this truncated-cone like device utilises mirrors to reflect the light from the iridocorneal angle into the direction of the observer (as shown by the schematic diagram). In practice the image comes out roughly orthogonal to the back surface (nearer the practitioner), making observation and magnification with a slit lamp easy and reliable. The small, curved front surface does not rest on the cornea, but instead vaults over it, with lubricating fluid filling the gap. The border of the front surface rests on the sclera. While the view obtained is smaller than that of the Koeppe goniolens, it can be used with the patient sitting upright, and other mirrors within the device can be used to obtain views of other parts of the eye, such as the retina and the ora serrata.
- Zeiss indirect goniolens: this instrument uses a similar method to the Goldmann, but employs prisms in the place of mirrors. Its four symmetrical prisms allow visualisation of the iridocorneal angle in four quadrants of the eye simultaneously, and works well with a slit lamp. Most importantly, the size and shape of the instrument - a smaller front surface that rests on the cornea without requiring lubricating fluid, only the patient's tear film - allows for indentation gonioscopy, which can be used for further diagnosis.

There are many other goniolenses available for use, including modified versions of the aforementioned, which prove valuable for surgical use (goniotomy).

== Interpreting the gonioscopic image ==
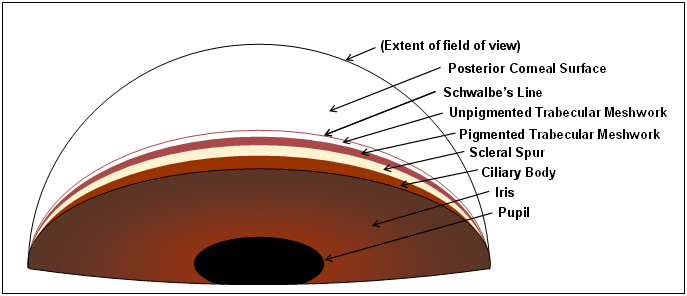
Sample view of wide angle

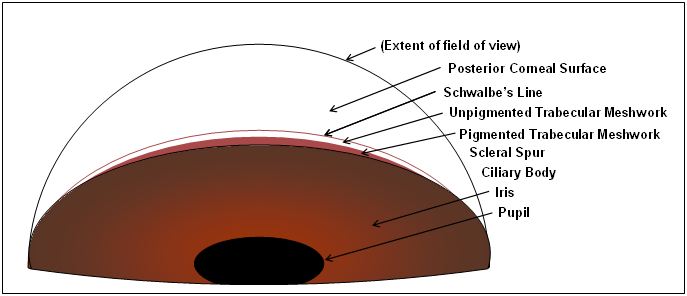
Sample view of narrow angle

- Iridocorneal angle width: The width of the iridocorneal angle is one factor affecting the drainage of aqueous humour from the eye's anterior chamber. A wide angle allows sufficient drainage of humour through the trabecular meshwork (unless obstructed), whereas a narrow angle may impede the drainage system and leave the patient susceptible to acute angle-closure glaucoma. Gonioscopy indicates the angular width of the iridocorneal angle by the number of ocular structures visible above the rim of the iris. Generally the more structures visible, the wider the angle. However, not all structures may be easily discriminated, especially the faint Schwalbe's line at the top of the stack. Further information is obtained if a very narrow slit lamp beam may be shone upon the angle, as the angle width is generally proportional to the separation of the corneal beam and iris beam when they meet in the angle.

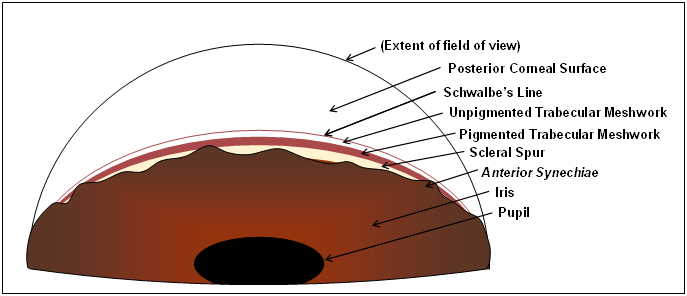
Sample view of anterior synechiae

- Anterior synechiae: Anterior synechiae are simply strands of the iris attaching to the iridocorneal angle or surrounding tissue. This may be exacerbated by ocular inflammation, which can render the angle 'sticky' with inflammatory cells and substances, or by structural defects in the iris which lead to strands floating free into the anterior chamber, as may occur with iris atrophy and congenital iris defects. Gonioscopy allows a direct view of these synechiae, and is thus especially helpful for the more subtle cases.

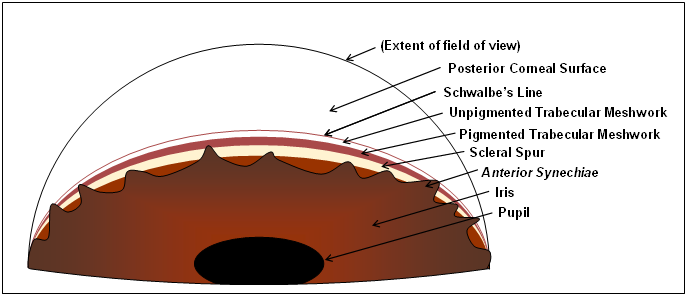
Sample view of anterior synechiae with indentation gonioscopy

- Indentation gonioscopy: An extension of the above two concepts, indentation gonioscopy involves the applied pressure of the goniolens against the eye, acutely raising the intraocular pressure in the anterior chamber and subsequently opening up the iridocorneal angle mechanically, allowing a greater understanding of the nature of the anterior synechiae. In the absence of synechiae, indentation gonioscopy may reveal the area where the cornea and iris are truly anatomically attached, as compared to where they are simply apposed against each other.
- Sampaolesi line: Hyperpigmentation at, or anterior to, Schwalbe's line, which can signify pigment dispersion syndrome or pseudoexfoliation syndrome.

== Etymology ==
The word originates from the Greek words γωνία (gōnía, "angle") and σκοπέω (skopéō, "to see"). (As an aside to help you remember, the suffix "-gon" in "polygon" and its relatives comes from the same root word, so "polygon" literally means "many angles".)
