= Trabecular meshwork =

Area of tissue in the eye

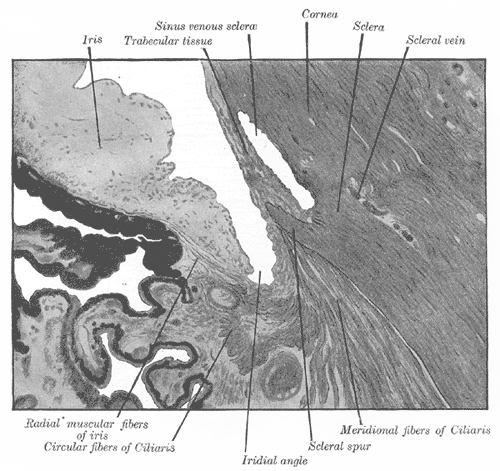
- Enlarged general view of the iridial angle. (When enlarged, visible with older label of 'trabecular tissue')

Details

Identifiers
- Latin: reticulum trabeculare sclerae
- MeSH: D014129

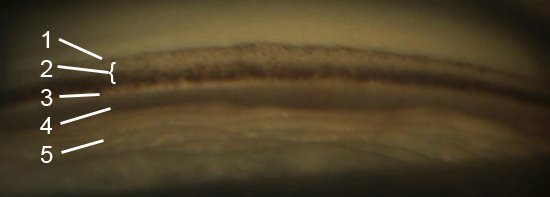
Gonioscopy of the anterior chamber angle. Labeled structures: 1. Schwalbe's line, 2. Trabecular meshwork (TM), 3. Scleral spur, 4. Ciliary body, 5. Iris

Gonioscopy of the anterior chamber angle

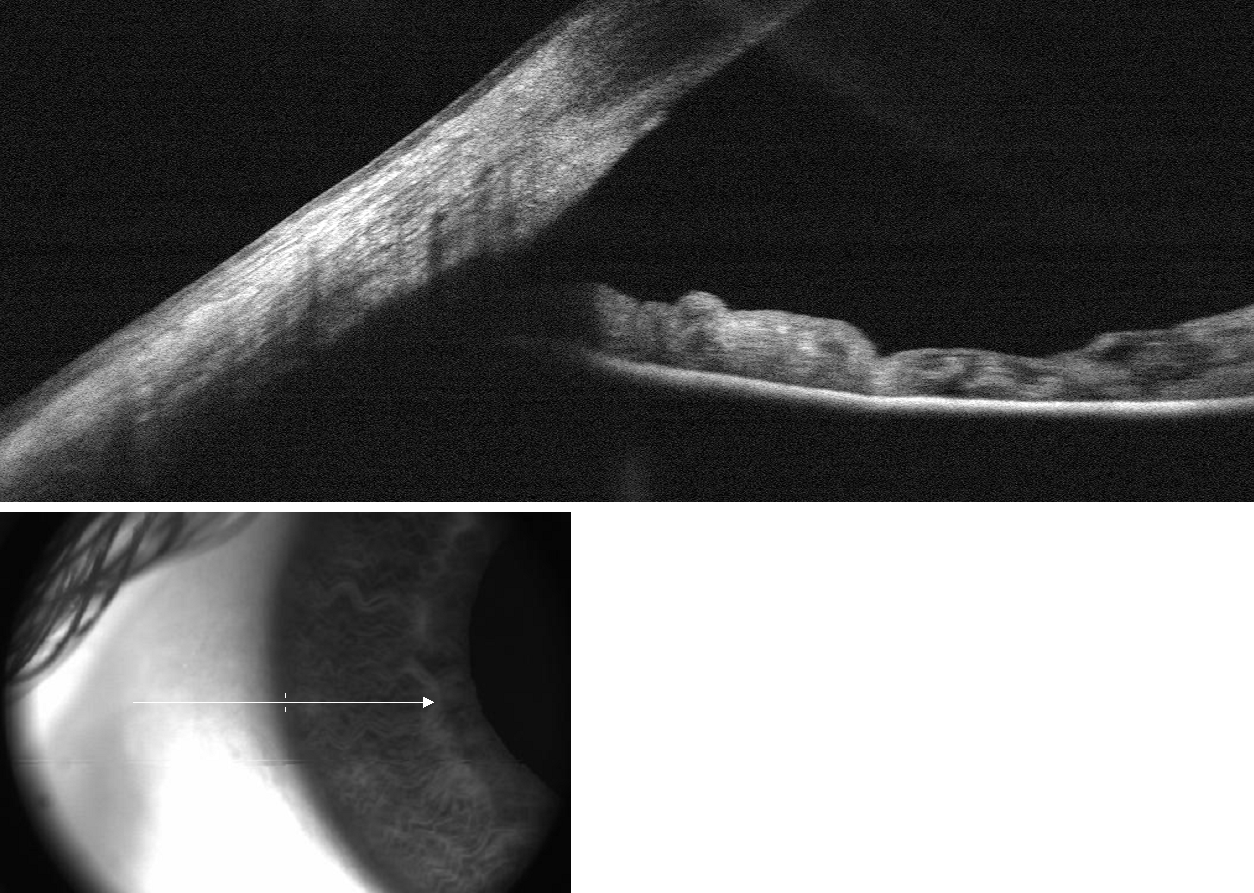
Anterior chamber angle cross-section imaged by an SD-OCT.

The trabecular meshwork is an area of tissue in the eye located around the base of the cornea, near the ciliary body, and is responsible for draining the aqueous humor from the eye via the anterior chamber (the chamber on the front of the eye covered by the cornea).

The tissue is spongy and lined by trabeculocytes; it allows fluid to drain into a set of tubes called Schlemm's canal which is lined by endothelium with blood and lymphatic properties that allow aqueous humor to flow into the blood system.

== Structure ==
The meshwork is divided up into three parts, with characteristically different ultrastructures:

1. Inner uveal meshwork - Closest to the anterior chamber angle, contains thin cord-like trabeculae, orientated predominantly in a radial fashion, enclosing trabeculae spaces larger than the corneoscleral meshwork.
2. Corneoscleral meshwork - Contains a large amount of elastin, arranged as a series of thin, flat, perforated sheets arranged in a laminar pattern; considered the ciliary muscle tendon.
3. Juxtacanalicular tissue (also known as the cribriform meshwork) - Lies immediately adjacent to Schlemm's canal, composed of connective tissue ground substance full of glycoaminoglycans and glycoproteins. This thin strip of tissue is covered by a monolayer of endothelial cells.

The trabecular meshwork is assisted to a small degree in the drainage of aqueous humour by a second outflow pathway, the uveo-scleral pathway (5-10% of outflow occurs this way). The uveo-scleral pathway is increased with the use of glaucoma drugs such as prostaglandins (e.g., Xalatan, Travatan).

The trabecular meshwork had previously been thought to arise from a point (apex) corresponding to the termination of the DM (Schwalbe's line) however it is now considered to extend into the cornea, forming the Dua's layer.

== Clinical significance ==
=== Glaucoma ===
It is thought that most cases of glaucoma (although not all) are caused or enabled by an increase in intraocular pressure. Pressure increases either when too much aqueous humor fluid is produced or by decreased aqueous humor outflow. The trabecular meshwork is responsible for most of the outflow of aqueous humor. When outflow is blocked, interventions such as trabeculectomy, trabeculoplasty, or aqueous shunt may be required to restore it.

== See also ==
- Ocular hypertension
