= Retinal vasculitis =

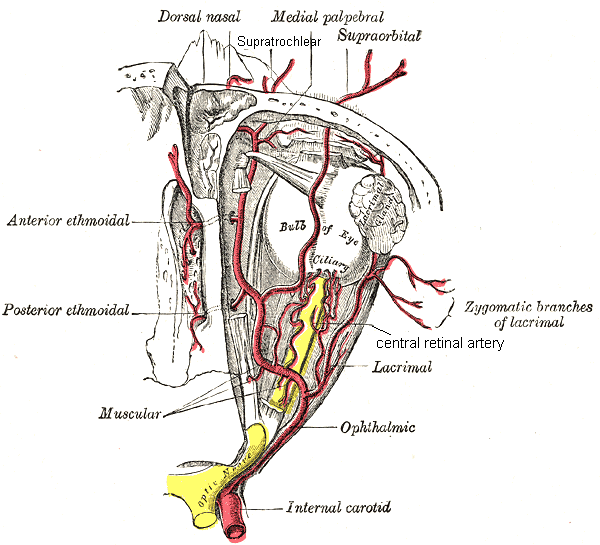
- Retinal artery (at center)
- Specialty: Neurology

Retinal vasculitis is inflammation of the vascular branches of the retinal artery, caused either by primary ocular disease processes, or as a specific presentation of any systemic form of vasculitis such as Behçet's disease, sarcoidosis, multiple sclerosis, or any form of systemic necrotizing vasculitis such as temporal arteritis, polyarteritis nodosa, and granulomatosis with polyangiitis, or due to lupus erythematosus, or rheumatoid arthritis. Eales disease, pars planitis, birdshot retinochoroidopathy (autoimmune bilateral posterior uveitis), and Fuchs heterochromic iridocyclitis (FHI) can also cause retinal vasculitis. Infectious pathogens such as Mycobacterium tuberculosis, visceral larva migrans (Toxocara canis & Toxocara cati) can also cause retinal vasculitis. Drug-induced vasculitis may involve retina as well, as seen in methamphetamine induced vasculitis.

== Symptoms ==
Retinal vasculitis presents as painless, decrease of visual acuity (blurry vision), visual floaters, scotomas (dark spot in vision), decreased ability to distinguish colors, and metamorphopsia (distortion of images such as linear images).

=== Diseases associated with retinal vasculitis ===
- Behçet's disease
- Common Variable Immune Deficiency
- Eales disease
- Granulomatosis with polyangiitis
- Idiopathic Retinal Vasculitis Aneurysms and Neuroretinitis
- Lupus erythematosus
- Multiple sclerosis
- Polyarteritis nodosa
- Q fever
- Rheumatoid arthritis
- Sarcoidosis
- Temporal arteritis

== Diagnosis ==
Retinal vasculitis is very rare as the only presenting symptom. Often, there is sufficient systemic evidence to help the physician decide between any one of the aforementioned possible systemic diseases. For those patients who present with only vasculitis of the retinal vessels, great investigative effort (Chest X-ray, blood test, urinary analysis, vascular biopsy, ophthalmology assessment, etc.) should be undertaken to ensure that a systemic disease is not the hidden culprit.

=== Findings ===
Ophthalmic examination may reveal neovascularization (creation of new vessels in the retina), retinal vessel narrowing, retinal vessel cuffing, retinal hemorrhage, or possible vitritis (inflammation of the vitreous body) or choroiditis (inflammation of the choroid).

== Treatment ==
Intravitreal administration of corticosteroid and immunosuppressants in a case non infectious retinal vasculitis

Antimicrobial therapy is required in the case of infectious retinal vasculitis
