= Synechia =

In medicine, synechia can refer to:

- Synechia (eye)
- Asherman's syndrome (uterine synechia)
- Nasal synechiae
- Penile synechiae (adhesion of the foreskin to the glans)
