= ERAP =

ERAP may refer to:

- Economic Research and Action Project, community organizing programs from the Students for a Democratic Society.
- Entreprise de recherches et d'activités pétrolières, French petroleum company
- Erap, nickname for 13th President of the Philippines Joseph Estrada
- Endoplasmic reticulum aminopeptidase protein, a class of enzymes
  - ERAP1
  - ERAP2
