= Tinu (disambiguation) =

Tinu may refer to:

- Tinu in Estonia
- Tinu Yohannan, Indian cricketer
- Tubulointerstitial nephritis and uveitis (TINU)
