= Acute zonal occult outer retinopathy =

- Other names: AZOOR
- Pronunciation: uh-cute zoh-null uh-cult ow-tehr reh-tin-ah-puh-thee
- Specialty: Ophthalmology

Acute Zonal Occult Outer Retinopathy (AZOOR) is a rare, presumed inflammatory retinopathy that involves the outer regions of the retina and is typically associated with visual field defects and visual disturbances known as photopsia. It was first characterized in 1992 by Gass and since then, has been categorized into a group of disorders called white dot syndromes. The disease served as a major plot point in the BBC drama Second Sight which aired from 2000 to 2001.

AZOOR is most commonly seen in young to middle-age adults with a female predominance of approximately 3:1. One systematic review found the median age of onset to be 35 years; however, the condition may present anywhere between 12 and 85 years of age.

== Etiology ==
Though the exact mechanism is still undetermined, several have theorized the condition to be autoimmune or viral in origin. One study involving 51 patients with AZOOR found that 20% had a viral-like illness preceding presentation while 28% of patients had a history of at least one autoimmune disease. One systematic review found that of 427 patients with AZOOR, 27% had an extraocular autoimmune disease at the time of presentation.

Some investigations have revealed the presence of anti-retinal autoantibodies in patients with AZOOR, further suggesting an autoimmune etiology. However, anti-retinal autoantibodies can be seen in a variety of other conditions without direct effects, and some patients with AZOOR do not have autoantibodies present. Furthermore, given that patients have varying responses to steroids and immunomodulatory treatment, the etiology is more likely to be multifactorial than autoimmune alone. There has been no evidence that genetics plays a role in the condition. Though the exact anatomic target has not been verified, the condition appears to affect the retina at the level of the retinal pigment epithelium (RPE) and photoreceptors, given the findings on electroretinography (ERG).

== Signs and Symptoms ==
Patients with AZOOR typically present with one or more visual complaints including, most commonly, photopsia, as well as visual field loss or less commonly, blurry vision. Other case series have reported night blindness as a possible symptom as well. A majority of patients have unilateral involvement at the time of presentation, however many will develop bilateral involvement as the condition progresses. The photopsia is typically described as “shining” or “shimmering” lights. The visual field loss may present as enlargement of the physiologic blind spot or other field defects such as peripheral vision loss.

Upon initial examination and testing, patients will typically have mildly decreased visual acuity of 20/40 or better on the Snellen chart with a normal slit lamp examination, though there may be a mild vitritis indicated by a small number of cells within the vitreous. Patients may have a relative afferent pupillary defect (RAPD). Fundoscopy, or visualization of the back of the patient's eye including the retina and optic nerve, is often normal in AZOOR. However, RPE mottling and retinal atrophy may be seen as the condition progresses. Also with time, the retinal arteries may thin and the optic disk may become pale.

Rarely, patients with AZOOR have been reported to have choroidal neovascular membranes as a late manifestation of the disease.

Nearly all patients will have abnormalities on ERG, but the abnormalities may vary between rod-dysfunction, cone-dysfunction or both. The abnormalities typically coincide with the visual field defects.

== Testing and Diagnosis ==
AZOOR remains a diagnosis of exclusion, meaning that other similar conditions must be ruled out first. A diagnostic workup may include optical coherence tomography (OCT), visual field testing, fundus photography, fluorescein angiography, fundus autofluorescence, and ERG.

The differential diagnosis for patients with suspected AZOOR includes other white dot syndromes such as multiple evanescent white dot syndrome (MEWDS) or Birdshot chorioretinopathy, inherited retinal degenerations such as retinitis pigmentosa, autoimmune retinopathy, acute idiopathic enlarged blindspot syndrome (AIEBS), infectious retinopathy such as syphilis or HIV, toxic retinopathy, and others.

== Management and Prognosis ==
Many different therapies have been utilized in the management of AZOOR including local and systemic steroids, NSAIDs, antimicrobials, and watchful observation, none of which have proven to be more effective than the other. Unfortunately, due in part to the rarity of this condition, there have been no randomized control trials evaluating treatments for AZOOR, so the data on treatment efficacy comes from case series and cohort studies.

Fortunately, the natural history of the disease appears to show stabilization or improvement within 6 months in a majority of cases, even without treatment.
