= Uveitic glaucoma =

Glaucoma caused by uveitis or its treatments

Uveitic Glaucoma
- Other names: Uveitis Glaucoma, Anterior Uveitic Glaucoma, Anterior Non-Infectious Uveitic Glaucoma, Uveitis Associated with Glaucoma, Iritic Glaucoma
- Pronunciation: /ˌjuːvɪaɪtɪk ɡlaʊˈkoʊmə/
- Specialty: Ophthalmology, optometry, immunology
- Symptoms: Pain, blurry vision, headache, light sensitivity, eye redness, "floaters", decreased vision, blindness
- Types: Visual impairment
- Causes: Uveitis, Glucocorticoid treatment for uveitis

Uveitic glaucoma (or uveitis glaucoma, or anterior uveitic glaucoma, or anterior noninfectious uveitic glaucoma, or uveitis associated with glaucoma, or iritic glaucoma) is most commonly a progression stage of noninfectious anterior uveitis.

Noninfectious anterior uveitis is an inflammation of the anterior (front) part of the eye and is instigated by autoimmune or other noninfectious causes (noninfectious uveitis can also affect the posterior segments of the eye, and then is called posterior, pan or intermediate uveitis). The onset of noninfectious uveitis occurs in patients in their thirties, with up to 10% of cases diagnosed in children under the age of 16. The condition may persist as a chronic disease.

Noninfectious uveitis is the most common form of uveitis in developed countries. Approximately 30% of uveitis patients develop glaucoma as a result of the inflammation that occurs in uveitis, as a complication of steroid treatment or a combination of both.

Uveitis, as well as steroid treatment for uveitis, can cause an increased resistance to the flow of aqueous humour (the clear liquid suspended between the lens and the cornea) from the eye. This leads to an excess of fluid buildup, which exerts elevated pressure on the inside parts of the eye, or elevated intraocular pressure (IOP). Elevated intraocular pressure can in turn lead to optic nerve damage and glaucoma.

Based on epidemiological studies of uveitis, approximately 34-94/100,000 people will develop uveitic glaucoma (see Epidemiology section). Uveitic glaucoma patients are at significantly higher risk for visual field loss in the long term compared to patients who only have uveitis. Patients with uveitic glaucoma also experience a particularly high burden of care.

== Signs and symptoms ==
Because uveitic glaucoma is a progressive stage of anterior non infectious uveitis, uveitic glaucoma involves signs and symptoms of both glaucoma and uveitis.

Patients with acute non infectious anterior uveitis may experience the following symptoms: pain, blurry vision, headache, photophobia (discomfort or pain due to light exposure), or the observance of haloes around lights.

An ophthalmologist may be able to observe the main sign of active noninfectious anterior uveitis, which is the presence of immune cells (anterior chamber cells, or ACCs) floating within the anterior segment of the eye (see "Noninfectious anterior uveitis" in Diagnosis section). The ophthalmologist also may observe peripheral anterior synechiae (PAS), or adhesions between the iris and trabecular meshwork, the tissue responsible for draining aqueous humour from the eye.

Patients with uveitis who also experience symptoms of glaucoma may have uveitic glaucoma.

In an eye with uveitic glaucoma, the following glaucoma signs may be observed: elevated intraocular pressure, scotomas in the field of vision, defects in the fiber layer of the retinal nerve, and/or excavation (a regional deformation or depression of the optic nerve). Pupillary blocks, or the obstruction of "the flow of aqueous humor from the posterior chamber to the anterior chamber" due to a "functional block between the pupillary portion of the iris and the lens" may also be detected. Finally, the ophthalmologist may observe peripheral anterior synechiae (PAS), or adhesions between the iris and trabecular meshwork.

The dual presence of glaucoma and uveitis symptoms points to a diagnosis of uveitic glaucoma.

== Causes ==
Uveitic glaucoma is a progressive stage of anterior noninfectious uveitis. Patients diagnosed with anterior noninfectious uveitis may also develop glaucoma; in this case the condition is termed uveitic glaucoma. Uveitic glaucoma can arise from the inflammation that occurs in uveitis; from steroid treatment for uveitis; or a combination of both.

=== Uveitis inflammation ===
The inflammatory response associated with uveitis may lead to glaucoma. Active anterior uveitis flare-ups may develop quickly; in these cases, the inflammation can damage the tissues in the front part of the eye. Anterior uveitis may also be chronic; in these cases, repeated inflammation can cause progressive, accumulating damage to the eye tissues.

In all cases — acute one-time episodes, recurrent chronic inflammation or acute-on-chronic inflammation — damage to the eye tissues can cause increased resistance to the outflow of aqueous humour from the eye, which then increases the pressure inside the eye. In some chronic uveitis cases, the pressure inside the eye waxes and wanes due to the uveitis flare-ups.

Elevated pressure inside the eye can lead to irreversible optic nerve damage and glaucoma.

=== Steroid treatment for uveitis ===
Topical corticosteroids are the first-line treatment for an active flare-up of noninfectious anterior uveitis, and the only effective treatment available for active inflammation. However, steroid treatment for uveitis can lead to uveitic glaucoma. Corticosteroids increase the fluid pressure inside the eye by increasing resistance to the outflow of aqueous humour, which can cause optic nerve damage and glaucoma. Steroid treatment can therefore cause or worsen uveitic glaucoma.

Elevated pressure inside the eye typically develops 2 to 6 weeks after starting corticosteroid therapy, but can occur at any time during corticosteroid therapy and may continue for weeks after steroid use has been stopped. According to the Glaucoma Research Foundation, the risk of developing chronic steroid-induced glaucoma increases with every week of steroid use.

Around 90% of patients with open angle glaucoma experience a steroid response of elevated intraocular pressure following steroid treatment. Therefore, once uveitis patients have developed uveitic glaucoma, they should ideally avoid steroids wherever possible.

=== Combination of uveitis inflammation and steroid treatment ===
In some cases, uveitis inflammation and steroid treatment both contribute to elevated pressure inside the eye, which leads to optic nerve damage and glaucoma.

== Pathogenesis ==
=== Uveitic glaucoma as a result of recurring uveitic inflammation ===
Uveitic glaucoma can develop as a complication of anterior uveitis resulting from the inflammatory response associated with the disease. The inflammatory response can be characterized by occlusion of the trabecular meshwork, or blocking of the tissue that is responsible for draining aqueous humour from the eye. Another characteristic that presents in some patients is peripheral anterior synechiae (PAS), or adhesions between the iris and trabecular meshwork. These two characteristics of the inflammatory uveitic response can lead to an increase in intraocular pressure, and consequently to irreversible optic nerve damage and glaucoma.

Noninfectious uveitis is characterized by an inflammatory process that may be acute, recurrent, chronic or acute-on-chronic. Uveitic glaucoma is associated with an aggressive disease course caused by very high levels of intraocular pressure that wax and wane. When uveitis is acute, the onset of inflammation is rapid, with obstruction of intertrabecular spaces. When uveitis is chronic, recurrent bouts lead to tissue destruction from direct inflammation. Obstruction of the intertrabecular spaces characteristic of acute onset uveitis, as well as the repeated inflammation characteristic to chronic uveitis, can lead to elevated intraocular pressure. This can consequently cause optic nerve damage and glaucoma.

=== Uveitic glaucoma as a response to steroid treatment of uveitis ===
Uveitic glaucoma can also develop as a response to steroid treatment of uveitis. Corticosteroids cause a rise in the fluid pressure inside the eye. While the pathogenesis of corticosteroid-induced ocular hypertension is not fully understood, it likely involves swelling and remodeling (alterations to the extracellular matrix) of the trabecular meshwork, which leads to increased resistance to aqueous humour outflow and an increase in intraocular pressure. Another possible mechanism by which corticosteroids increase fluid pressure inside the eye is as follows:

1. Corticosteroids inhibit (partly prevent and slow) the breakdown of glycosaminoglycans (GAGs) in the trabecular meshwork.
2. GAGs accumulate in the meshwork.
3. Fluid drainage is decreased.
4. Fluid pressure in the eye is increased.

It has also been suggested that corticosteroids may be capable of modifying the trabecular meshwork cells, modulating their size as well as their cytoskeletal arrangement, which in turn could limit fluid drainage.

== Diagnosis ==
Uveitic glaucoma is a progression stage of noninfectious acute anterior uveitis. In order to diagnose uveitic glaucoma, a dual diagnosis of non-infectious anterior uveitis and glaucoma is required. A thorough examination of the eye by an ophthalmologist is performed in order to diagnose uveitic glaucoma.

=== Noninfectious anterior uveitis ===
[Main article: Uveitis]

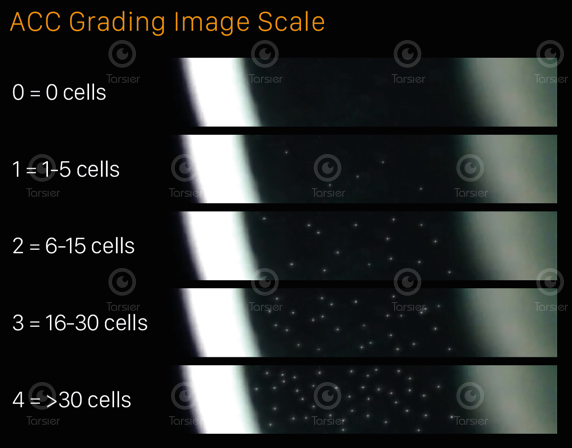
Demonstration of anterior chamber cells (ACCs) indicative of noninfectious anterior uveitis, as represented visually by the Tarsier Grading Image Scale (TGIS). Immune cells are represented by white dots.

The main diagnostic sign of noninfectious acute anterior uveitis is the presence of anterior chamber cells (ACCs), or immune cells, in the anterior, or front, chamber of the eye. The anterior chamber of healthy eyes does not contain any immune cells, hence the main indicator of noninfectious anterior uveitis is the presence of immune blood cells inside the anterior chamber of the eye. The more cells found floating in the anterior chamber, the more severe the uveitis.

The quantity of immune cells present in the anterior chamber can be determined via a slit lamp examination.

In 2005, an International Working Group on SUN (Standardization of Uveitis Nomenclature) took steps towards standardizing the methods for reporting clinical data in the field of uveitis. One of their products was a grading scheme for anterior chamber cells.

In 2021, a new slit lamp–based ACC assessment method, TGIS (Tarsier Grading Image Scale), was developed. TGIS uses a visual analog scale to enable pattern recognition-based evaluation of ACC density during a uveitic flare-up. This is achieved by graphically representing a high-power field slit beam through the anterior chamber, from the cornea to the lens surface.

Another important clinical measurement of ocular inflammation is flare. Flare is the leakage of various proteins (such as fibrin and cytokines) into the ocular anterior chamber, as a manifestation of inflammation. It will usually have a "milky" appearance. Flare can also be observed via slit lamp examination.

=== Glaucoma ===
[Main article: Glaucoma]

Glaucoma is a group of eye diseases that result in damage to the optic nerve (or retina) and cause vision loss.

Glaucoma is challenging to diagnose and relies on several different methods of assessment to determine the level of optic nerve damage. These may include tonometry, a procedure to determine pressure inside the eye; a visual field test, which assesses peripheral vision; and imaging tests of the optic nerve.

== Treatment ==
Treatment for uveitic glaucoma requires addressing the noninfectious anterior uveitis as well as the glaucoma present in uveitic glaucoma patients. Most urgently, the inflammation associated with uveitis must be identified and treated, to ensure as little damage to the eye as possible. Secondly, the elevated intraocular pressure associated with glaucoma must be treated. Steroid treatment may be discouraged because of the associated side effects.

=== Treatment of noninfectious anterior uveitis ===
Topical corticosteroid eyedrops are first-line treatment for uveitis and represent the only approved topical treatment for active non-infectious anterior uveitis. They are the only effective treatment for the short term available today. Corticosteroids can also be administered via periocular injection or intravitreal (IVT) injection. In more severe cases, treatment may be administered systemically via oral or intravenous corticosteroids.

Other treatments, including systemic immunosuppressive agents — which require close monitoring — may be considered where corticosteroids are ineffective or if there are concerns regarding side effects. Immunosuppressive agents include T-cell inhibitors such as cyclosporine and tacrolimus; antimetabolites such as azathioprine, methotrexate, mycophenolate mofetil, and leflunomide; alkylating agents such as cyclophosphamides and chlorambucil; and biological drugs such as adalimumab.

Most uveitis patients are treated with local steroids in the acute phase but may also need long-term treatment with lower-dose steroids as a preventive measure between flare-ups. This precaution is employed in order to minimize the use of topical corticosteroids, due to their severe ocular side effects.

Despite significant advances in therapeutics, the prevalence of blindness secondary to uveitis has not been reduced in the U.S. for the past 30 years.

=== Challenges related to steroid treatment of noninfectious anterior uveitis ===
Steroid treatment for uveitis can lead to uveitic glaucoma. Corticosteroids increase the fluid pressure inside the eye (by increasing the resistance to the outflow of aqueous humour), which can cause optic nerve damage and glaucoma. Steroid treatment can therefore cause or worsen uveitic glaucoma.

Studies show that 40% to 50% of patients treated with the corticosteroid triamcinolone via intravitreal injection developed clinically significant ocular hypertension. Corticosteroid-induced ocular hypertension typically develops 2 to 6 weeks after starting therapy but can occur at any time during corticosteroid therapy and may persist for weeks after corticosteroids have been discontinued. According to the Glaucoma Research Foundation, "every week of steroid use averaged over a lifetime leads to a 4% increased risk of chronic steroid[-induced] glaucoma".

In addition, around 90% of patients with pre-existing open angle glaucoma develop an additional adverse response to steroid treatment.

=== Treatment of uveitic glaucoma ===
Glaucoma medications, glaucoma surgery and steroids are the primary options for addressing uveitic glaucoma. Approximately 30% of uveitic glaucoma patients require surgical intervention due to insufficient intraocular pressure control while on maximum medicinal therapy.

Available surgical interventions to treat the glaucoma in uveitic glaucoma patients pose a high risk to the eye, with a lower success rate compared to glaucoma surgeries in non-uveitic eyes. Steroids for treating uveitic glaucoma patients also carry high risks.

Because of the risks inherent in steroid treatment and the ineffectiveness of surgical interventions for uveitic glaucoma, there is currently no approved treatment for uveitic patients who also have glaucoma.

A steroid-free medication for uveitis in uveitic glaucoma patients, formulated by Tarsier Pharma, is currently undergoing clinical trials [see Research section].

=== Challenges related to surgical treatment of uveitic glaucoma ===
Uveitic glaucoma patients respond poorly to glaucoma surgery; surgery in uveitic glaucoma patients commonly has complications. These complications are caused by either the surgical wound healing improperly or unhealthy levels of pressure inside the eye.

Glaucoma surgery usually leads to increased levels of inflammation in the eyes. This is an undesirable consequence, especially in uveitis patients, who already have a high tendency to develop inflammation. Because of this, 80% of uveitis experts report that glaucoma surgeries for uveitic glaucoma patients are likely to fail. Surgery in an eye with uveitis is associated with a higher complication rate, and in some cases surgeries such as valve implantation are too complicated to perform.

== Prognosis for uveitic glaucoma patients ==
About 30% of uveitis patients also develop uveitic glaucoma. Uveitic glaucoma patients are at significantly higher risk for visual field loss in the long term (>5 years) compared to patients who only have uveitis. A patient who only has glaucoma (without uveitis) will, on average, become blind in one eye within 20 years of glaucoma onset. This is especially devastating given that the majority of uveitic glaucoma patients are diagnosed with uveitis at a relatively young age (in their thirties). Thus developing glaucoma at a young age and the cumulative damage of uveitis flare-ups put these patients at high risk of losing their eyesight.

The burden of care for uveitis glaucoma patients is also higher than that of uveitis patients without glaucoma. On average, doctors report 60% more visits from uveitic glaucoma patients than non-glaucomatous uveitis patients. Doctor visits are 40% longer for patients with uveitic glaucoma than for uveitis patients without glaucoma.

== Epidemiology ==
According to epidemiological studies, the prevalence of uveitis is estimated at 115-316 occurrences in 100,000 people in the United States. About 30% of patients with non-infectious anterior uveitis also develop glaucoma. Accordingly, 34-94 people in every 100,000 patients in the United States with uveitis will develop glaucoma.

== Research ==
=== Steroid-free medication for uveitis and uveitic glaucoma ===
A steroid-free eyedrop medication for uveitis and uveitic glaucoma patients, TRS01, is undergoing clinical investigation (as of May 2022). TRS01 is intended as an anti-inflammatory medication for uveitis and uveitic glaucoma that is not anticipated to contribute to elevated intraocular pressure and glaucoma. Up to May 2022, two Phase I/II clinical trials testing TRS01 have been completed. Several dozen patients have undergone these trials. TRS01 is now being investigated in a Phase III clinical trial in patients with noninfectious anterior uveitis, including some with uveitic glaucoma.
