= Intermediate uveitis =

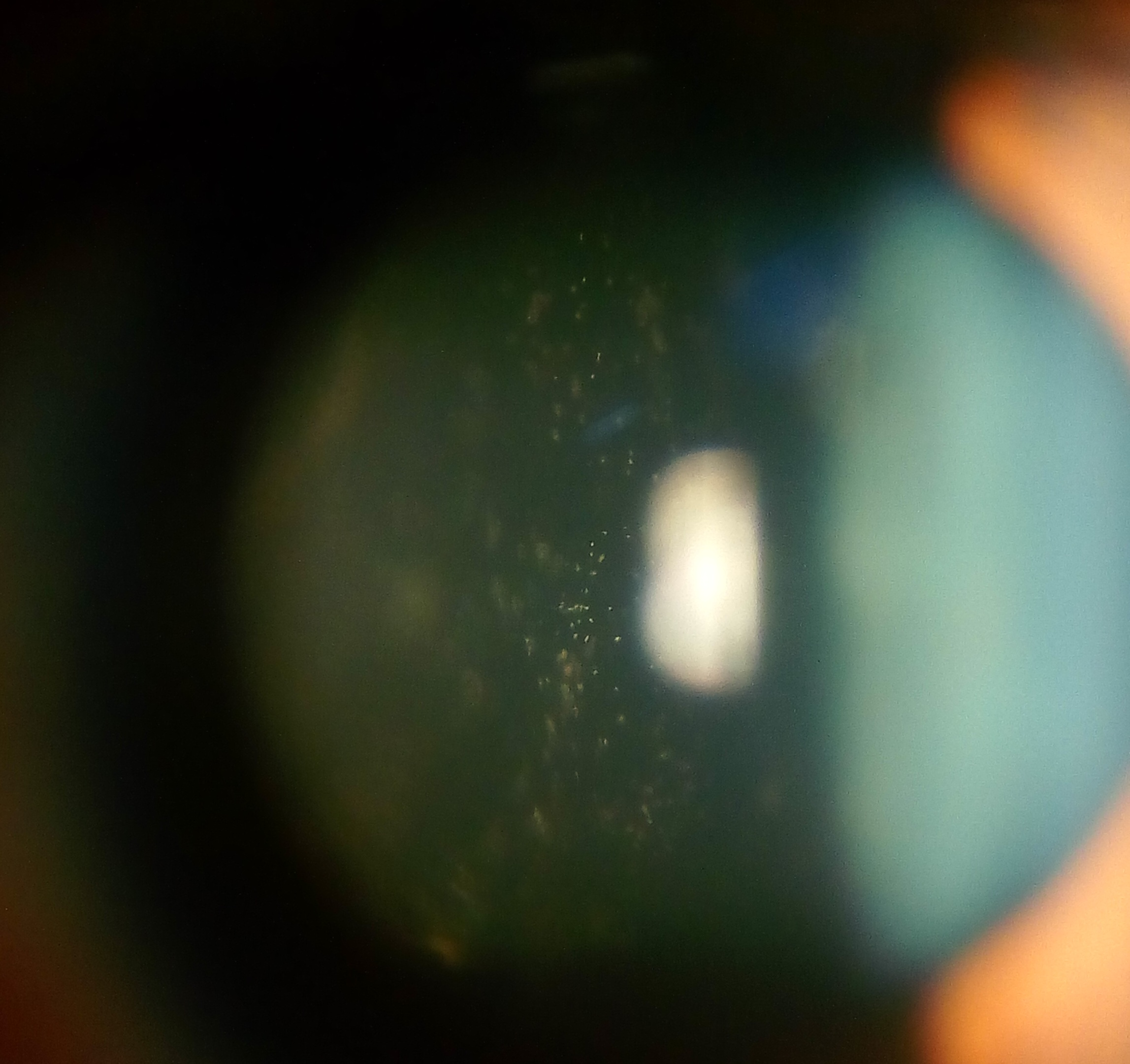
- Anterior vitreous cells in Intermediate uveitis
- Specialty: Ophthalmology

Intermediate uveitis is a form of uveitis localized to the vitreous and peripheral retina. Intermediate uveitis may either be an isolated eye disease or associated with the development of a systemic disease such as multiple sclerosis or sarcoidosis. As such, intermediate uveitis may be the first expression of a systemic condition. Infectious causes of intermediate uveitis include Epstein–Barr virus infection, Lyme disease, HTLV-1 virus infection, cat scratch disease, and hepatitis C.

Permanent loss of vision is most commonly seen in patients with chronic cystoid macular edema (CME). Every effort must be made to eradicate CME when present. Other less common causes of visual loss include retinal detachment, glaucoma, band keratopathy, cataract, vitreous hemorrhage, epiretinal membrane and choroidal neovascularization.

== Signs and symptoms ==
Clinical signs include redness of the eye, pain, blurring of vision, photophobia and floaters.

However, some individuals, particularly children, can present with few to no symptoms.

=== Associated conditions ===
Associations of the disease with such entities as multiple sclerosis, sarcoidosis, or inflammatory bowel disease suggest an autoimmune component in at least a subset of patients. The clustering of familial cases has led to the investigation of human leukocyte antigen (HLA) associations. The inciting event appears to be peripheral retinal perivasculitis and vascular occlusion leading to ocular inflammation, vitritis and snowbank formation. The etiology of the antigenic stimulus is not clear and may be either vitreal or perivascular in nature. It is evident that genetics plays some role in the pathophysiology of intermediate uveitis, but the importance remains unclear.

== Pathophysiology ==
Pars planitis is considered a subset of intermediate uveitis and is characterized by the presence of white exudates (snowbanks) over the pars plana or by aggregates of inflammatory cells in the vitreous (snowballs) in the absence of an infectious or a systemic disease. Some physicians believe that patients with pars planitis have worse vitritis, more severe macular edema, and a guarded prognosis compared to other patients with intermediate uveitis.

== Treatment ==
Peri-ocular injection of corticosteroids (injection of corticosteroids very close but not into the eye). In resistant cases oral administration of corticosteroids, immunosuppressive drugs, and laser or cryotherapy of the involved area may be indicated.

Steroid implants have been explored as a treatment option for individuals with non-infectious uveitis. Research comparing fluocinolone acetonide intravitreal implants to standard-of-care treatments (prednisolone with immunosuppressive agents) found that while the steroid implant treatment possibly prevents the recurrence of uveitis, there may be adverse safety outcomes, such as the increased risk for needing cataract surgery and surgery to lower intraocular pressure.

== Epidemiology ==
Although intermediate uveitis can develop at any age, it primarily afflicts children and young adults. There is a bimodal distribution with one peak in the second decade and another peak in the third or fourth decade.

In the United States the proportion of patients with intermediate uveitis is estimated to be 4-8% of uveitis cases in referral centers. The National Institutes of Health reports a higher percentage (15%), which may indicate improved awareness or the nature of the uveitis referral clinic. In the pediatric population, intermediate uveitis can account for up to 25% of uveitis cases.
