= Corneal keratocyte =

Cell type

Keratocytes movement

Corneal keratocytes (corneal fibroblasts) are specialized fibroblasts residing in the stroma. This corneal layer, representing about 85-90% of corneal thickness, is built up from highly regular collagenous lamellae and extracellular matrix components. Keratocytes play the major role in keeping it transparent, healing its wounds, and synthesizing its components. In the unperturbed cornea keratocytes stay dormant, coming into action after any kind of injury or inflammation. Some keratocytes underlying the site of injury, even a light one, undergo apoptosis immediately after the injury. Any glitch in the precisely orchestrated process of healing may cloud the cornea, while excessive keratocyte apoptosis may be a part of the pathological process in the degenerative corneal disorders such as keratoconus, and these considerations prompt the ongoing research into the function of these cells.

== Origin and functions ==
Keratocytes are developmentally derived from the cranial population of neural crest cells, from whence they migrate to settle in the mesenchyme. In some species the migration from neural crest comes in two waves, with the first giving birth to the corneal endothelium and the second invading the epithelium-secreted stromal anlage devoid of cells; in other species both populations come from a single wave of migration. Once settled in the stroma, keratocytes start synthesizing collagen molecules of different types (I, V, VI) and keratan sulfate. By the moment of eye opening after birth the proliferation of keratocytes is all but finished and most of them are in the quiescent state.

By the end of eye development an interconnected keratocyte network is established in the cornea, with dendrites of neighbouring cells contacting each other. Quiescent keratocytes synthesize the so-called crystallins, known primarily for their role in the lens. Corneal crystallins, like the lens ones, are thought to help maintain the transparency and optimal refraction. They are also part of corneal antioxidant defense. Crystallins expressed by human keratocytes are ALDH1A1, ALDH3A1, ALDH2 and TKT. Different sets of crystallins are typical to distinct species. Keratan sulfate produced by keratocytes is thought to help maintain optimal corneal hydration; genetic disruption of its synthesis leads to the macular corneal dystrophy.

According to one study, average keratocyte density in the human stroma is about 20500 cells per mm^{3}, or 9600 in a column of 1 mm^{2} in section. The highest density is observed in the upper 10% of the stroma. The number of keratocytes declines with age, at a rate approximately 0.45% per year.

After an injury to the cornea, some keratocytes undergo apoptosis, prompted by the signaling molecules secreted by the upper layers, such as IL1 alpha and TNF-alpha. Other neighbouring keratocytes, when acted upon by the same molecules, become active, proliferate and start synthesizing matrix metalloproteinases that cause tissue remodeling. These activated cells are designated in different sources either as "active keratocytes" or "fibroblasts" or are said to assume a "repair phenotype". After heavier injuries or at the advanced stages of healing process a number of keratocytes transforms into myofibroblasts actively secreting ECM components; this transformation is thought to be caused by TGF-beta. As soon as the basement membrane of corneal epithelium is restored, TGF beta inflow into the stroma drastically decreases and myofibroblasts disappear, after which the remaining activated keratocytes continue for some time to reshape the extracellular matrix, secreting IL1-alpha in order to maintain their "repair phenotype".

Apoptosis of keratocytes, either in quiescent or active state, is a process that attracts special attention. In a healthy cornea the programmed cell death is a rare occasion, but immediately after an injury to the uppermost layer keratocytes directly under the injury site commit apoptosis. One hypothesis explains such rapid reaction by the need to stem the possible infection from spreading into the cornea, because due to the limitations of ocular immune system the immune cells take up to several hours to arrive at the site of injury. In a normal course of events, the lack of keratocytes is gradually replenished by the mitosis of the adjacent cells. Apoptosis is observed after eye operations, including keratotomy and laser surgery, and may play a role in the development of post-surgery complications.

== Clinical significance ==
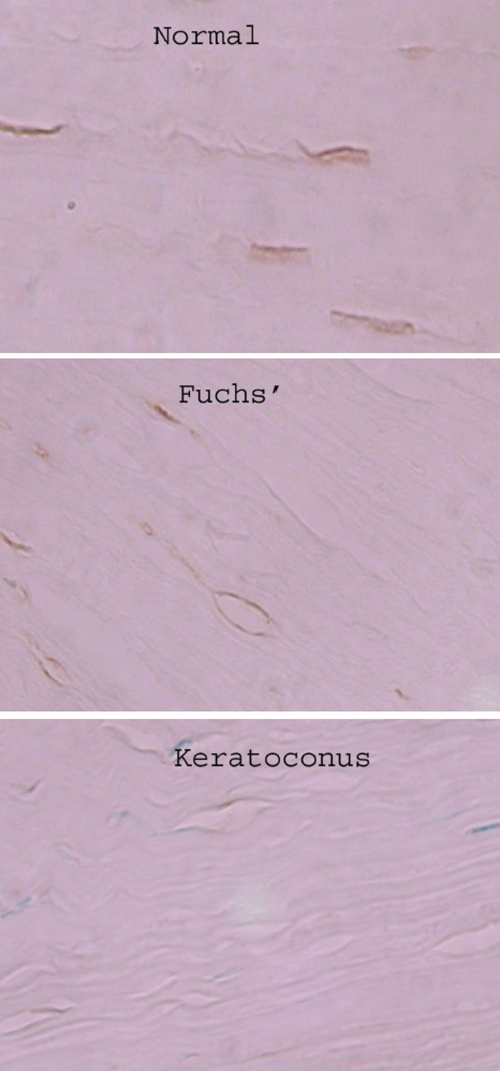
Alcohol dehydrogenase immunoreactivity in a healthy cornea (top), in Fuchs' dystrophy and keratoconic cornea. Diaminobenzidine stains keratocytes in the cross-section of cornea. From Mootha et al., 2009.

Keratocytes may play a role in different corneal disorders. According to comparative research, their functions drastically diverge from the norm in keratoconus, the most frequent form of corneal dystrophy. In keratoconic corneas they have been shown to commit apoptosis far away from any epithelial injury; a hypothesis exists that presents excessive keratocyte apoptosis as a major pathological event in keratoconus. According to one study, patient's keratocytes have decreased levels of one of the alcohol dehydrogenase subforms, they secrete significantly less superoxide dismutase 3, according to another.

== See also ==
- List of human cell types derived from the germ layers
