= Ocular immune system =

Immune system of the human eye

Human eye.

The ocular immune system protects the eye from infection and regulates healing processes following injuries. The interior of the eye lacks lymph vessels but is highly vascularized, and many immune cells reside in the uvea, including mostly macrophages, dendritic cells, and mast cells. These cells fight off intraocular infections, and intraocular inflammation can manifest as uveitis (including iritis) or retinitis. The cornea of the eye is immunologically a very special tissue. Its constant exposure to the exterior world means that it is vulnerable to a wide range of microorganisms while its moist mucosal surface makes the cornea particularly susceptible to attack. At the same time, its lack of vasculature and relative immune separation from the rest of the body makes immune defense difficult. Lastly, the cornea is a multifunctional tissue. It provides a large part of the eye's refractive power, meaning it has to maintain remarkable transparency, but must also serve as a barrier to keep pathogens from reaching the rest of the eye, similar to function of the dermis and epidermis in keeping underlying tissues protected. Immune reactions within the cornea come from surrounding vascularized tissues as well as innate immune responsive cells that reside within the cornea.

== Immune difficulties for the cornea ==
The most important function of the cornea is to transmit and refract light so as to allow sharp (high-resolution) images to be produced on the back of the retina. To do this, collagen within the cornea is highly ordered to be 30 nanometers in diameter and placed 60 nanometers apart so as to reduce light scatter. Furthermore, the tissue is not vascularized, and does not contain lymphoid cells or other defense mechanisms, apart from some dendritic cells (DC). Both of these factors necessitate the small number of cells within the cornea. However, this necessitates keeping immune cells at a relative distance, effectively creating a time delay between exposures to a pathogen and mounting of an immune response. Therefore, many immune and protective responses within the cornea, such as moistening and nutrition, come from non-local sources, such as the conjunctiva.

== Immune responses of the cornea ==
Innate immune responses defend against pathogens and toxins in a non-discriminatory manner. They provide an inherent barrier against corneal infection while also serving as a primary mode of defense that is present from birth. For instance, the orbit and the eyelid can guard against both traumatic events and exterior debris that may contain microorganisms. Other components of the ocular innate immune system include tears, epithelial cells, keratocytes, corneal nerves, the complement system, and interferons.

Acquired immune responses are much more pathogen-specific than their innate immune counterparts. These pathways are cell-mediated and are understood to be controlled in part by Langerhans cells in the cornea. These Langerhans cells are antigen-presenting cells, which pick up pieces of invading pathogens and use them to elicit an immune response. Cell-mediated immune responses are much slower acting but more efficient, but can cause damage to surrounding tissue, resulting in damage to the vision.

== Mucosa-associated lymphoid tissue ==
Both innate and acquired responses are important in ocular defenses. One major pathway in which both are incorporated is the network of lymphoid cells that form the mucosa-associated lymphoid tissue (MALT). MALT is a major component in all mucosal organs, including the respiratory, genital, digestive, and ocular tracts. Regulated migrations of immune cells are known to occur between these mucosal organs. However, the role of MALT in human ocular defenses is not fully understood. However, it is known that the lacrimal glands and the conjunctiva contribute to ocular defenses via secretion of both immunoglobulins and lymphoid tissues. The latter is understood to be organized into clumps of lymphoid follicles as well as diffuse lymphoid tissues. In the follicular form of MALT, antigens are taken up by the follicles and presented to lymphocytes by antigen presenting cells. This leads to activation of B and T cells that carry out the immune reaction. Diffuse lymphoid tissues, on the other hand, is composed mainly of interspersed effector cells. Generally, both pathways lead to activation and migration of immune cells within the mucosal tissues, including the conjunctiva.

== Conjunctival immune response ==
The conjunctiva covers the sclera, or whites of the eyes, as well as the insides of the eyelids and provides nutrients to underlying and surrounding tissue. The conjunctiva is also one of the closest vascularized tissues to the cornea. As such, it provides a major source of immune components in the cornea. Not only does the conjunctiva produce IgA, like the lacrimal glands, but it also contains macrophages, neutrophilic granulocytes, mast cells, lymphocytes, and other aspects of the general mucosal immune system. Like the rest of the MALT pathway, the conjunctiva has been found to possess lymphoid follicles, which develop at puberty and decline in old age, as well as diffuse lymphoid tissues. The conjunctiva also possess macrophages that play a part in modulating the T-cell immune response and mediating both the innate and acquired immune responses.

== Lacrimal immune response ==
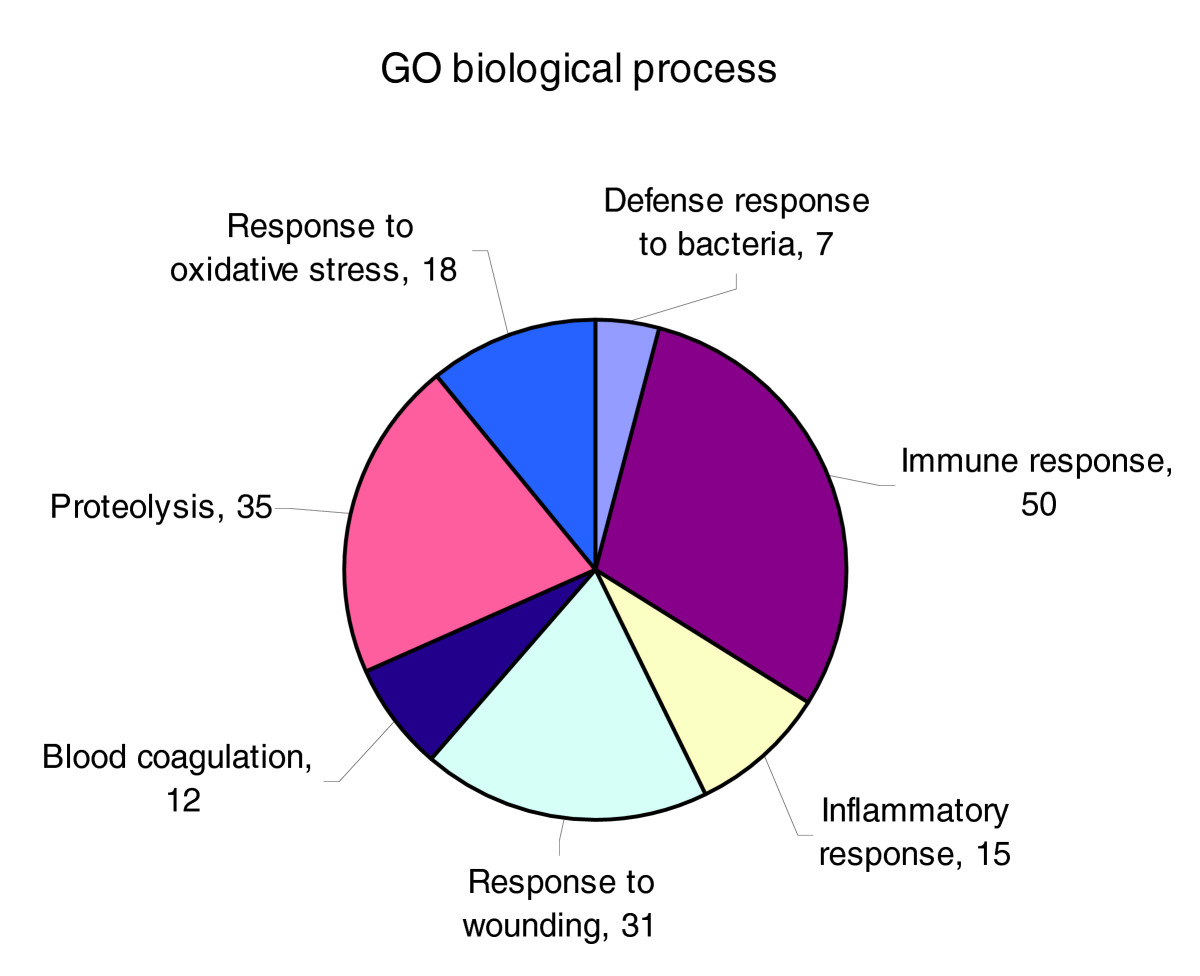
Biological processes that might be active in the tear fluid, based on Gene Ontology data. From de Souza et al., 2006.

The tear film is composed of three layers: the lipid, aqueous, and mucin. These play a role in creating a smooth surface to facilitate refraction, lubricating the movement of the eyelid, passively transporting gases such as oxygen and carbon dioxide, and protecting the cornea. This last function is achieved through functions of various layers within the tear film. Tears bathe corneal epithelial cells in a moist environment, preventing them from drying out and weakening. However, the liquid layer of the tear film also contains antimicrobial properties resulting from the presence of lysozymes, lactoferrins, lipocalin, and beta-lysine, which facilitate pathogen defenses such as lysis of bacterial cell walls, prevention of bacterial and viral binding, inflammation, and detoxification. Furthermore, white blood cells can be transported to the corneal surface via the tear film, and both toxic agents as well as debris can be diluted and washed away by the tear film. The tear film also contains immunoglobulins, especially IgA, which is found in concentrations significantly higher than in serum. IgA has been shown to prevent bacterial binding. Along with another immunoglobulin present in the tear film, IgG, IgA can also neutralize viruses and bind to bacteria, aiding in their detection via other pathways.

== Corneal epithelial cells ==
Corneal epithelial cells present a physical barrier to prevent microbes from reaching the interior of the eye chamber, which is effectively separated from the rest of the body via tight junctions. At the same time, corneal epithelial cells also secrete cytokines to activate microbial defense. One cytokine, interleukin (IL)-1α, is stored in epithelial cells and automatically released when the cell membrane is ruptured by infection or trauma. However, long-term effects of IL-1α can lead to not only enhanced immune infiltration of the cornea, but also neovascularization (formation of new blood vessels), which can lead to a loss of corneal transparency. Therefore, the cornea has also been found to secrete an IL-1α antagonist, IL-1RN, which decreases leucocyte invasion of the cornea and suppresses neovascularization, both of which can help preserve vision.

== Corneal keratocytes ==
Keratocytes are flattened cells found dispersed within the corneal stroma. The primary role of this sparse population of cells is thought to be in maintaining the extracellular matrix of collagen lamellae that surround them. However, keratocytes also play a defensive role during pathogenic invasion. They can be influenced by IL-1α (secreted by corneal epithelial cells) and tumor necrosis factor (TNF)-α to produce both IL-6 and defensins. Of these, the former is found to combine synergistically with other interleukins to increase co-stimulation of other immune aspects as well as increase antibody secretion. The latter, defensins, have a wide range of antimicrobial affects against bacteria, fungi, and viruses, as well as effects in accelerating healing of damaged epithelial cells. It has also been found that the presence of secreted defensins secreted by corneal keratocytes is correlated with cases of corneal transplant rejection, suggesting that these peptides may have a role in tissue rejection. Furthermore, keratocytes have also been found to secrete IL-8, which attracts neutrophils, in infections involving the herpes simplex virus.

== Corneal nerves ==
Corneal nerves serve as a form of defense by detecting the presence of foreign bodies on the corneal surface. This leads to reflexive reactions such as increased lacrimal secretion, blinking, and release of neuropeptides, which can induce cytokine activation.

== See also ==
- TGF beta - important in maintaining immune privilege
