= Second Sight (TV series) =

- Genre: Crime drama
- Created by: Paula Milne
- Written by: Paula Milne; Antonia Hallem; Niall Leonard
- Directed by: Charles Beeson; Edward Bennett; Maurice Phillips; Jonas Grimas
- Starring: Clive Owen; Claire Skinner; Rupert Holliday-Evans; Mark Bazeley; Akbar Kurtha; Frank Harper; Alexander Morton
- Composer: John Lunn
- Country of origin: United Kingdom
- Original language: English
- No. of series: 2
- No. of episodes: 8

Production
- Executive producers: Claudia Milne; Tessa Ross; Peter Ansorge; Rebecca Eaton
- Producer: David Lascelles
- Cinematography: Rex Maidment; Eric Gillespie; Graham Frake
- Editors: David Blackmore; John Wilson; Nick McPhee
- Running time: 60 minutes
- Production company: Twenty Twenty Television

Original release
- Network: BBC One
- Release: 9 January 2000 – 6 February 2001

Second Sight is a British television crime drama, principally written and created by Paula Milne, that first aired on BBC One on 9 January 2000. Originally broadcast as a single two-part pilot, before being followed by a series of three two-part stories, Second Sight follows DCI Ross Tanner (Clive Owen), a maverick cop who finds out that he has a rare disease, AZOOR, which is causing him to lose his sight. Tanner's boss, Superintendent Lawson (Thomas Wheatley), little suspects that the man he named to head the elite Specialist Elite Murder Unit is losing his sight. Tanner struggles to keep his condition a secret, but soon asks himself how long can he keep solving crimes that not even the fully sighted can fathom.

The series also follows Tanner's battles with his irrepressible Inspector, Catherine Tully (Claire Skinner), who urges him to tell the truth for the sake of his own health. Rebecca Egan also co-stars as Tanner's long-suffering wife, Marilyn; while Benjamin Smith appears as his son, Sam.

The complete series was later released on DVD on 24 July 2006 via 2|Entertain.

== Cast ==
- Clive Owen as DCI Ross Tanner
- Claire Skinner as DI Catherine Tully
- Selina Boyack as DC Tanya Holt
- Rupert Holliday-Evans as DS Robert Pewsey
- Mark Bazeley as DI Michael Boyd (series)
- Akbar Kurtha as DC Mohammad Chad (series)
- Frank Harper as DS Tommy Finch
- Alexander Morton as DS Eddie Julian
- Thomas Wheately as Supt Jim Lawson (series)
- Rebecca Egan as Marilyn Tanner
- Benjamin Smith as Sam Tanner

== Transmissions ==
Series	Episodes	Originally released	
Series	Episodes	First released	Last released
Pilot	2	9 January 2000	16 January 2000
Series	6	22 January 2001	6 February 2001

== Episodes ==
=== Pilot (2000) ===
No.	Title	Directed by	Written by	Original release date	Viewers (millions)
1	"Second Sight: Part One"	Charles Beeson	Paula Milne	9 January 2000	7.25
DCI Ross Tanner of the Specialist Elite Murder Unit is working on a case with ambitious DI Catherine Tully when he makes the frightening discovery that he is slowly losing his sight. Tully discovers his secret, and agrees to cover for him – under certain conditions.
2	"Second Sight: Part Two"	Charles Beeson	Paula Milne	16 January 2000	N/A
DCI Tanner and company try to work through an ever-growing list of suspects for the murder. Tanner suspects that Matthew's stepfather, Adam, is hiding something, but does that make him the killer?

=== Series (2001) ===
No.	Title	Directed by	Written by	Original release date	Viewers (millions)
1	"Hide and Seek: Part One"	Edward Bennett	Antonia Hallem	22 January 2001	N/A
Tanner must gather evidence against his prime suspect in a murder case under difficult circumstances – but as he struggles to conceal his failing eyesight, DI Tully oversteps her authority, leaving him professionally exposed.
2	"Hide and Seek: Part Two"	Edward Bennett	Antonia Hallem	23 January 2001	N/A
Tanner decides to recreate the scene of the vicious murder of Vicky Ingham, but his plan to use her young son creates conflicts within the unit. Tanner's moves come under close scrutiny from DI Boyd.
3	"Parasomnia: Part One"	Maurice Phillips	Paula Milne	29 January 2001	N/A
A man is found bludgeoned to death after his stag night. The following morning his fiancée, the daughter of a Labour peer, wakes to find herself covered in blood, but is adamant that she is innocent of murder.
4	"Parasomnia: Part Two"	Maurice Phillips	Paula Milne	30 January 2001	N/A
Tanner continues to struggle with hallucinations as well as a terrifying recurring dream. All the evidence points to the victim's fiancée, but what was her motive for the murder?
5	"Kingdom of the Blind: Part One"	Jonas Grimas	Niall Leonard	5 February 2001	5.75
Investigating orchestrated race violence, Tanner comes up against the malevolent and manipulative Harold King, a retired gangster, who is also blind. Just as Tanner has harnessed his blindness to uncover the truth, King uses his to realise his bitterness and hate.
6	"Kingdom of the Blind: Part Two"	Jonas Grimas	Niall Leonard	6 February 2001	N/A
Tanner's investigation into the Ben Harris murder takes him even deeper into the dark underworld of organized crime – and to his dismay, the main witness has changed his story.
