= ERAP2 =

Protein-coding gene in the species Homo sapiens

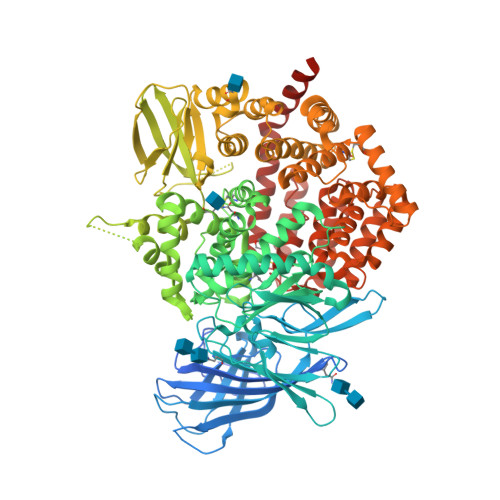

Identifiers
- Aliases: ERAP2, L-RAP, LRAP, endoplasmic reticulum aminopeptidase 2
- External IDs: OMIM: 609497; GeneCards: ERAP2
Available structures
PDB	Human UniProt search: PDBe RCSB
PDB	List of PDB id codes 3SE6, 4E36, 4JBS, 5CU5, 5AB2, 5AB0

Gene location (Human)
Chr.	Chromosome 5 (human)
Band	5q15	Start	96,875,986 bp
Band	5q15	End	96,919,703 bp
RNA expression pattern
Bgee	Human / Mouse (ortholog); Top expressed in: buccal mucosa cell; granulocyte; lymph node; superficial temporal artery; visceral pleura; epithelium of nasopharynx; monocyte; epithelium of colon; appendix; Achilles tendon / n/a; More reference expression data
BioGPS	n/a
Gene ontology
Molecular function	aminopeptidase activity; metallopeptidase activity; peptidase activity; hydrolase activity; zinc ion binding; metal ion binding; peptide binding; metalloaminopeptidase activity; endopeptidase activity
Cellular component	integral component of membrane; endoplasmic reticulum lumen; endoplasmic reticulum membrane; membrane; endoplasmic reticulum; plasma membrane; cytoplasm
Biological process	immune system process; adaptive immune response; proteolysis; regulation of blood pressure; antigen processing and presentation of peptide antigen via MHC class I; peptide catabolic process; antigen processing and presentation of endogenous peptide antigen via MHC class I; signal transduction; cell-cell signaling
Sources:Amigo / QuickGO
Orthologs
Databases	NCBI: entry; OMA: entry
Species	Human	Mouse
Entrez	64167	n/a
Ensembl	ENSG00000164308	n/a
UniProt	Q6P179	n/a
RefSeq (mRNA)	NM_001130140; NM_022350; NM_001329229; NM_001329233	n/a
RefSeq (protein)	NP_001123612; NP_001316158; NP_001316162; NP_071745	n/a
Location (UCSC)	Chr 5: 96.88 – 96.92 Mb	n/a
PubMed search		n/a
- Wikidata
View/Edit Human

Endoplasmic reticulum aminopeptidase 2 (ERAP2) is a protein that in humans is encoded by the ERAP2 gene. ERAP2 is part of the M1 aminopeptidase family. It is expressed along with ERAP1 in the endoplasmic reticulum (ER). In the ER, both enzymes help process and present antigens by trimming the ends of precursor peptides. This creates the optimal pieces for display by Major Histocompatibility Complex (MHC) class I molecules.

== Biology / Functions ==
=== Expression ===
ERAP2 expression is regulated by interferon gamma signalling. While ERAP2 and homologous enzyme ERAP1 are both expressed in immune cells, the expression of the enzymes is independently regulated in other tissues without significant correlation of expression levels. However, coordinated expression patterns have also been observed, in which ERAP2 downregulation is counterbalanced by an increase in ERAP1 expression. Overexpression of ERAP2 in various cancer types, including melanomas and different adenocarcinomas, has been suggested to modulate the presentation of cancer antigens on MHC-I, which may affect cancer invasion by immune cells. ERAP2 is not expressed in mice making it more difficult to study.

=== Antigen presentation ===
Unlike ERAP1, ERAP2 can trim efficiently peptides that already have optimal length for MHC class I presentation. Thus ERAP2 has been shown to shorten peptides of 9 or fewer amino acids, thereby destroying antigenic peptides in some cases. Beyond N-terminal trimming, ERAP2 has also been reported to influence the immunopeptidome through internal sequence preferences that shape peptide motifs presented by specific MHC class I alleles. In the context of HLA-A29, ERAP2 expression promotes the generation of a distinct HLA-A29-specific peptide submotif. This peptide motif is detectable in putative autoantigens implicated in HLA-A29-associated birdshot uveitis, a disease strongly associated with genetic variation in ERAP2 and ERAP1. Analyses of the HLA-A29 immunopeptidome further indicate that ERAP2-dependent peptide selection reflects internal sequence specificity beyond simple N-terminal trimming.

ERAP2 displays a preference for peptide substrates that carry N-terminal basic residues (arginine, lysine). A fraction of ERAP2 is reported to form complexes with ERAP1, as seen in co-precipitation experiments. Heterodimer formation improves peptide-trimming efficiency, resulting in an expanded antigenic repertoire and a more diverse immune response. The ERAP1-ERAP2 complex can trim free peptides in the ER and may also be able to trim MHC I-bound precursor peptides, according to some authors. Individuals homozygous for ERAP2 haplotype B lack ERAP2 protein expression and have significantly lower MHC class I levels on the surface of B cells. This may result in an altered presentation of antigens and resulting immune responses.

=== Other functions ===
ERAP2 can modulate the renin-angiotensin system (RAS) in blood pressure homeostasis through angiotensin cleavage. In concert with ERAP1, ERAP2 counteracts angiotensin II activity, inducing vasodilation and hypertension reduction. Blood pressure modulation by ERAP2 is supported by the association of ERAP2 with blood pressure progression and hypertension incidence. Its link to pre-eclampsia in multiple populations shows further support for the role of ERAP2 in blood pressure homeostasis.

== Genetics / clinical significance ==
=== Gene / location ===
ERAP2 gene is located on human chromosome 5 in between the ERAP1 and LNPEP genes encoding the other two family members of the M1 aminopeptidases. It has 41,438 base pair length and consists of 19 exons.

=== SNPs and disease association ===
The ERAP2 gene is highly polymorphic and contains many common single nucleotide variants (SNVs) that are in strong linkage disequilibrium and are maintained at intermediate frequencies through balancing selection. There are two common SNVs in ERAP2 that facilitate the alternative splicing of three haplotypes by altering splice motifs. Under steady state conditions, the truncated mRNA is destroyed by nonsense mediated decay (NMD), but during influenza infections it is translated to two truncated isoforms. Accordingly, 25% of the general population (haplotype B homozygotes) are deficient in full-length ERAP2 protein. The G allele of SNV rs17486481 activates a cryptic splice site upstream of exon 12 that also introduces premature stop codons and makes the transcript likely vulnerable to NMD (termed haplotype C). ERAP2 expression is directly controlled by the splice region variant rs2248374. However, disease-associated variants in the downstream LNPEP gene promoter are independently associated with ERAP2 expression and show that multiple SNPs act in concert to regulate ERAP2 expression.Different ERAP2 protein haplotypes (or allotypes) have been detected among the major continental populations based on common missense variants in ERAP2. ERAP2 haplotypes are associated with severe inflammatory conditions (e.g., birdshot chorioretinopathy, Crohn's disease, ankylosing spondylitis, psoriasis) and cancer treatment responses. Interestingly, the alleles from SNVs that strongly predispose to autoimmune conditions (i.e., A allele of rs2248374 and other SNVs in haplotype A) display natural selection in recent human history, which has been suggested to provide higher resistance against severe respiratory illnesses, including the bubonic plague ("Black Death"), pneumonia and COVID-19. Klunk et al. found that individuals with the protective allele (dominant in the present European population) had a fivefold increase in ERAP2 expression in macrophages resulting in reduced replication of Y. pestis.

Large-scale genomic studies have identified SNPs in ERAP2 as key host factors influencing control of latent Epstein–Barr virus (EBV) infection. These findings suggest that variation in ERAP2 may contribute to differences in host control of EBV latency and viral DNA persistence. Given the established role of EBV in B-cell biology, genetic associations between EBV activity and autoimmune diseases such as multiple sclerosis and systemic lupus erythematosus (SLE) indicate shared host pathways linking viral persistence and immune-mediated disease.

== Structure / Mechanism ==
=== Structure ===
ERAP2 is composed of 4 structural units (I-IV), with the HEXXHX_{18}E zinc-binding motif and the known GAMEN aminopeptidase motif located in domain II, similarly to its closely related enzyme ERAP1. The catalytic site features a single Zn(II) ion and is coordinated by two histidine residues (H370, H374) and a glutamate residue (E393). Domains II and IV, which are linked by domain III, form a large internal cavity close to the catalytic site and exclude the external solvent, in accordance with the "closed" conformation obtained for ERAP1.

=== Mechanism ===
ERAP2 selects substrates by sequestering them in its internal cavity and allowing interactions to determine trimming rates, thus combining substrate permissiveness with sequence bias. A crystal structure of ERAP2 with a peptide product located in this cavity has revealed lack of deep specificity pockets and lack of a cavity that interacts with the peptide C- terminus, which justify the limited selectivity of this enzyme and the differences in length selection compared to ERAP1 (ERAP2 can effectively trim 8-mer peptides, while it is less active with longer substrates). Interactions between side-chains of a 10-mer phosphinic analogue and residues of the interior of the cavity also appear shallow and opportunistic, further confirming its ability to process a variety of peptide substrates. In terms of N-terminal residue specificity, ERAP2 prefers basic amino acids, such as arginine.

=== Interactions ===
Some experimental evidence has suggested the formation of a heterodimer between ERAP2 and the homologous enzyme ERAP1. Formation of leucine zipper-fused heterodimers of ERAP1 and ERAP2 produces mature epitopes more efficiently than a dilute mixture of the two enzymes. The interaction of ERAP2 with ERAP1 changes basic enzymatic parameters of the latter and improves its substrate-binding affinity. A possible dimerization between ERAP1/ERAP2 could be the basis for enhanced synergism between these two enzymes which helps define the human immunopeptidome.

== Therapeutic approaches and pharmacology ==
Therapeutic approaches for ERAP2 regulation rely mostly on the development of small molecule inhibitors. The most explored classes of inhibitors for ERAP2 are the allosteric site ones.

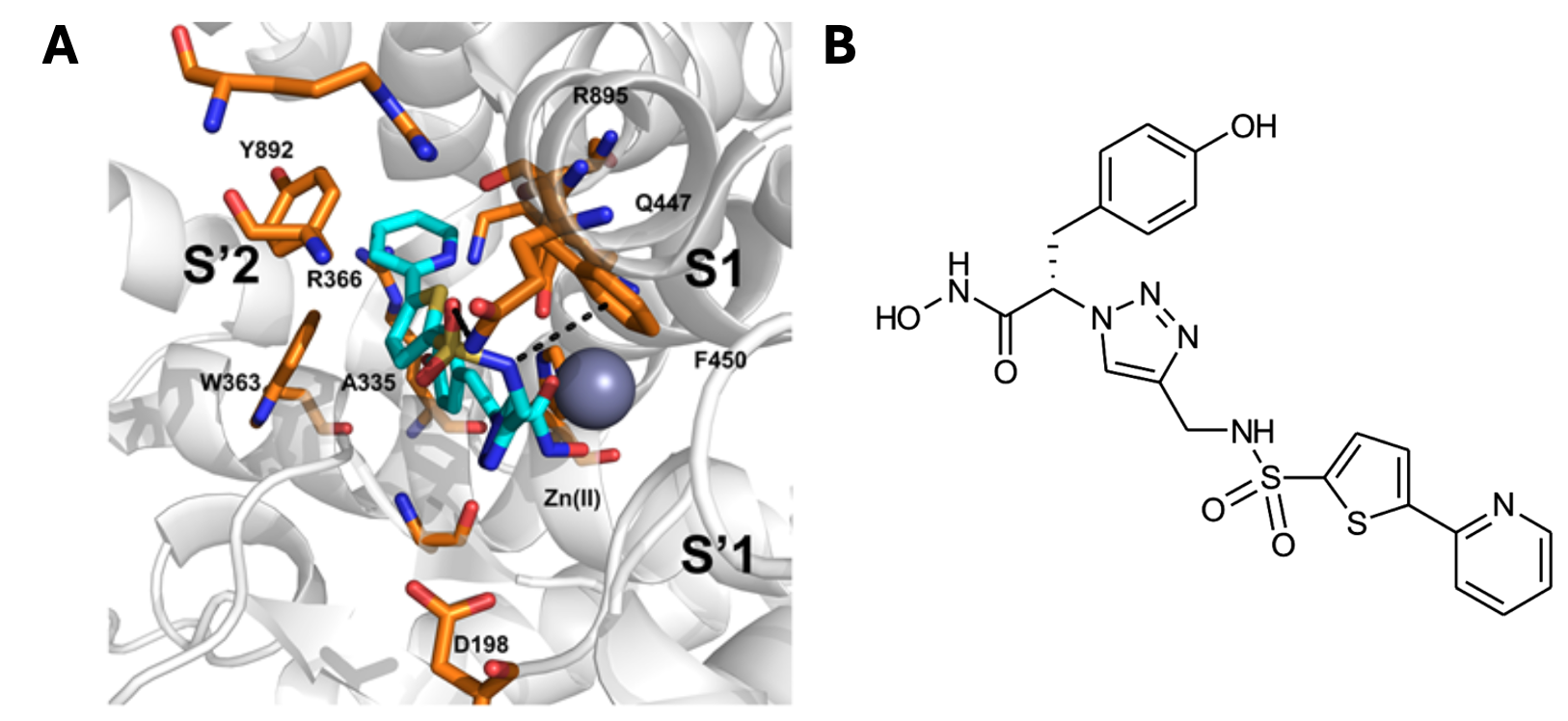
Figure 1. A. Crystal structure of ERAP2 co-crystallized with hydroxamic acid triazole in the active site. Adapted and recreated from PDB code 7NSK. B. 2D chemical structure of co-crystallized compound.

=== ERAP2 catalytic site inhibitors ===
- Phosphinic derivatives

Although most of the phosphinic pseudopeptide analogs disclosed by Kokkala et al. in 2016 were non-selective ERAP inhibitors, compound 1 displayed nanomolar potency towards ERAP2 (IC_{50} = 129 nM) with a highly improved selectivity against ERAP1, and was active in modulating the immunopeptidome of cancer cells.

- Hydroxamic acid triazoles

In 2022, the first nanomolar selective ERAP2 inhibitors were discovered by kinetic-target guided synthesis (KTGS). A central core structure of hydroxamic acid triazoles targets the zinc ion in the catalytic site. Further investigations to optimize the activity led to nanomolar inhibitor BDM88952 (IC_{50} = 3.9 nM) with the relative protein-ligand interactions studied by ERAP2 X-ray co-crystallography (Figure 1).

- Carboxylic acids

Two hits of carboxylic acid derivatives were identified via high-throughput screening (HTS) against ERAP2, from an in-house library of 1920 compounds. Compound 3 was amongst those selected for their potency (ERAP2, IC_{50} = 22 nM) and selectivity. Docking studies revealed that the carboxylic acid is predicted to coordinate the catalytic zinc ion within ERAP2. Several analogues were designed and synthesized.

=== ERAP2 allosteric site inhibitors ===
- Sulfonamides

Sulfonamide compound 4 was identified as a potential allosteric inhibitor against ERAP2 in 2022 by Arya et al.. This compound targets ERAP2 through an uncompetitive manner (IC_{50} = 44 μM) by inhibiting the hydrolysis of peptide substrates. At the same time it acts as a competitive inhibitor against ERAP1 (IC_{50} = 73 μM).

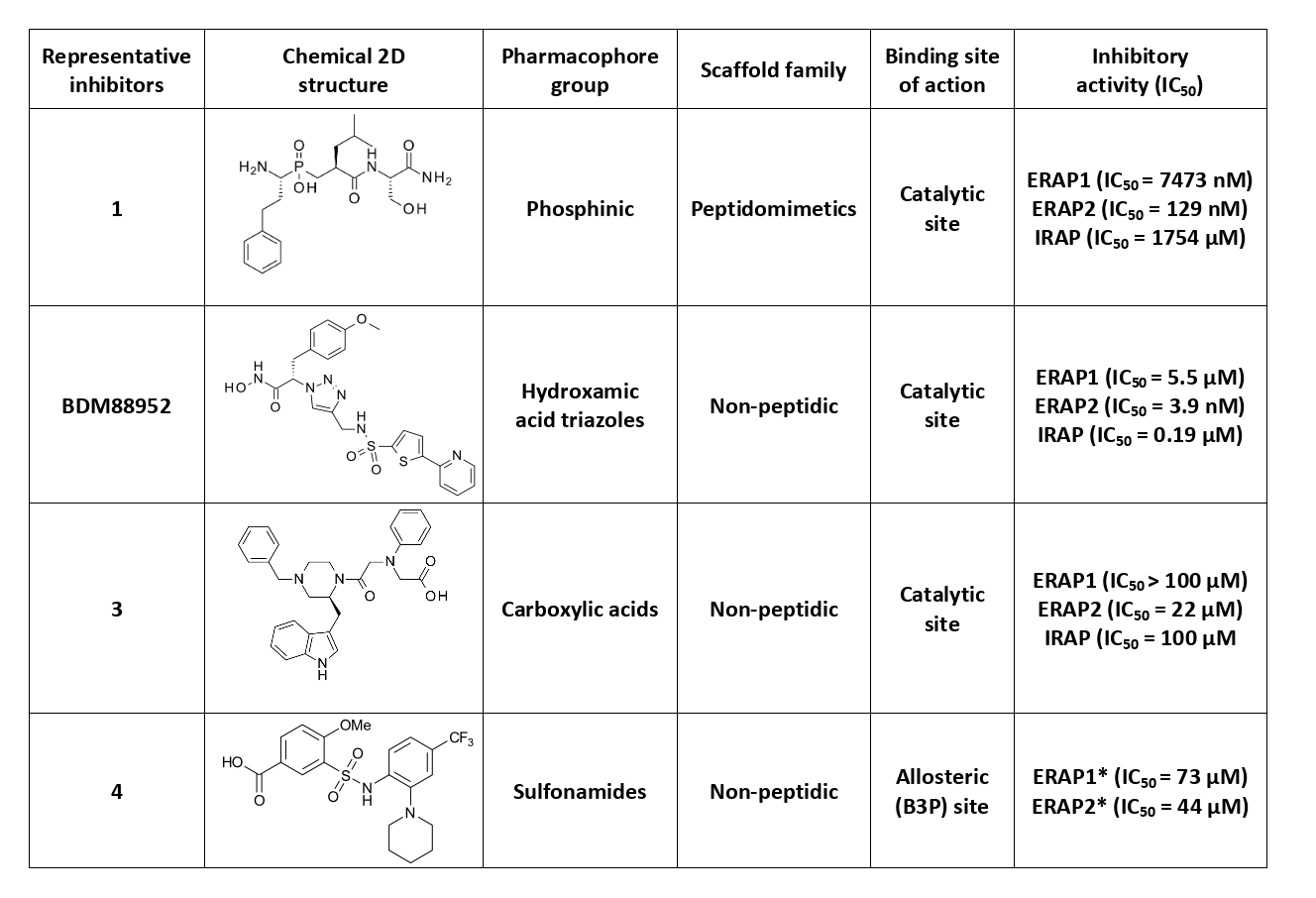
Table 1. Representative examples of reported ERAP2 inhibitors. *IC_{50} value measured on long-peptide assay.
