= Tubulointerstitial nephritis and uveitis =

- Other names: Acute tubulointerstitial nephritis and uveitis syndrome
- Specialty: Ophthalmology

Tubulointerstitial nephritis and uveitis (TINU) is a rare medical condition in which there is uveitis (inflammation of the uvea in the eye) together with tubulointerstitial nephritis (inflammation of the tubules inside the kidney).

== Symptoms and signs ==
Uveitis may cause pain of the affected eye together with changes in vision. It may be accompanied by nonspecific systemic symptoms such as fever, involuntary weight loss, fatigue, loss of appetite, abdominal pain, and joint pains.

Laboratory diagnosis We can see increased eosinophils under microscope after biopsy.

== History ==
It was first described in 1975.
