= Dendrite (non-neuronal) =

Branching projection of the cytoplasm of a cell

A dendrite is a branching projection of the cytoplasm of a cell. While the term is most commonly used to refer to the branching projections of neurons, it can also be used to refer to features of other types of cells that, while having a similar appearance, are actually quite distinct structures.

Non-neuronal cells that have dendrites:

- Dendritic cells, part of the mammalian immune system
- Melanocytes, pigment-producing cells located in the skin
- Merkel cells, receptor-cells in the skin associated with the sense of touch
- Corneal keratocytes, specialized fibroblasts residing in the stroma.
- Osteocytes, the most abundant cells in mature bone.
