= Band keratopathy =

Clouding of the eye's cornea due to calcification

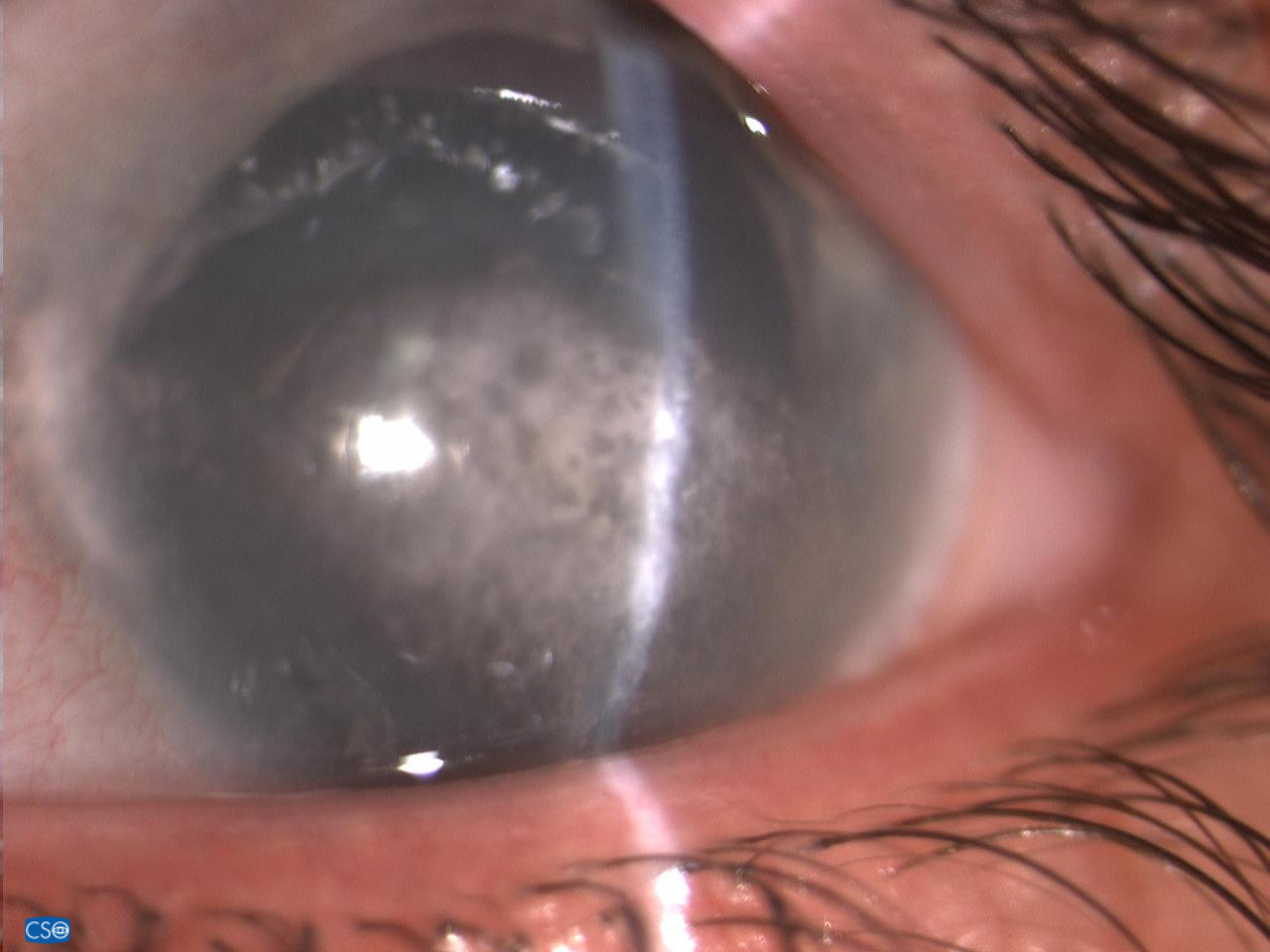
- Band Keratopathy in a left eye.
- Specialty: Ophthalmology

Band keratopathy is a corneal disease derived from the appearance of calcium on the central cornea. This is an example of metastatic calcification, which by definition, occurs in the presence of hypercalcemia.

== Signs and symptoms ==
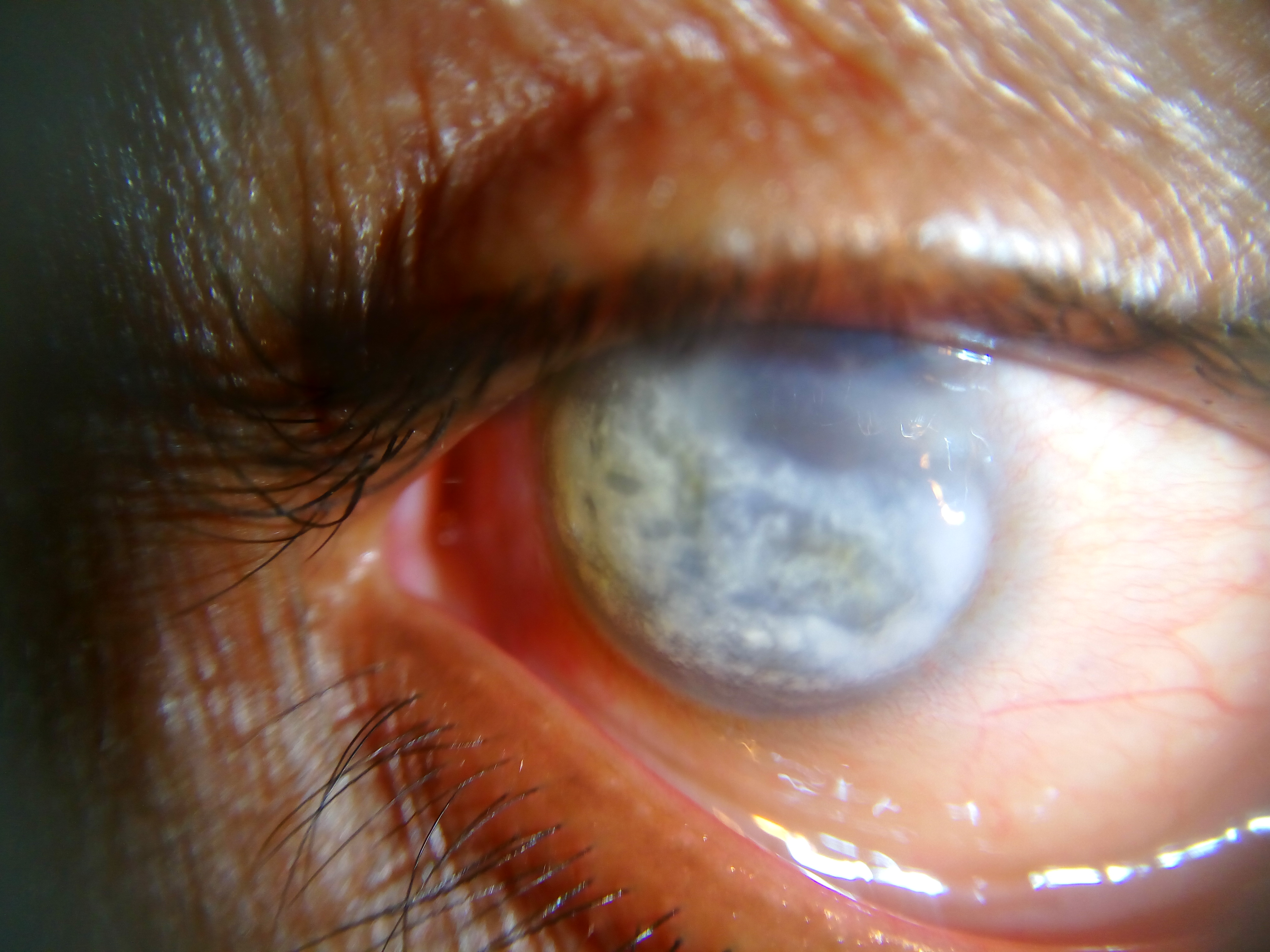
Band keratopathy of a 60-year-old male

Signs and symptoms of band keratopathy include eye pain and decreased visual acuity.

== Causes ==
Band keratopathy has several causes. These causes include uveitis, interstitial keratitis, superficial keratitis, phthisis, sarcoidosis, trauma, intraocular silicone oil, systemic diseases (high levels of calcium in the blood, vitamin D intoxication, Fanconi's Syndrome, low levels of phosphorus in the blood, gout, milk-alkali syndrome, myotonic dystrophy, and chronic mercury exposure).

== Pathology ==
Band keratopathy is seen when there is calcification of the epithelial basement membrane, Bowman's layer, and the anterior stroma with destruction of Bowman's layer. The calcium salts are intracellular when the process is due to alteration of systemic calcium metabolism, whereas they are extracellular when due to local disease.

== Diagnosis ==
Band keratopathy is diagnosed by slit lamp examination of the eye.

== Treatment ==
Treatment is indicated if vision is threatened or if the eye is uncomfortable. It is important to recognize and treat any underlying condition. Improvement of vision may be obtained by scraping off the opacity. Topical disodium EDTA can be used as a chelating agent. It can also be removed with the excimer laser (phototherapeutic keratectomy). Other modalities include diamond burr and lamellar keratoplasty.
