= Vitritis =

- Other names: Hyalitis, Vitreitis
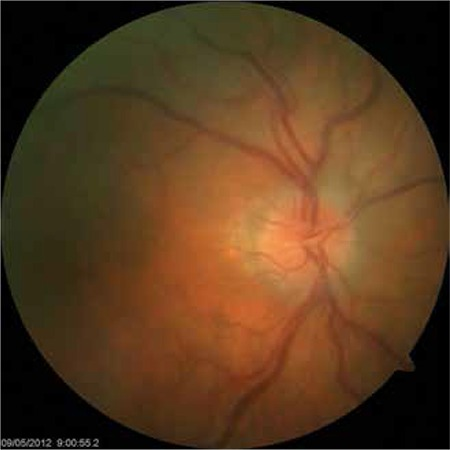
- Fundus photograph of the right eye showing mild vitritis with increase in vascular tortuosity
- Specialty: Ophthalmology

Vitritis is an inflammation of the vitreous characterized by vitreous white blood cells. It is a form of uveitis and is associated with anterior uveitis and more commonly intermediate or posterior uveitis. It is important to distinguish vitritis from other types of cells in the vitreous cavity such as red blood cells (vitreous hemorrhage), pigment cells (retinal tear), and tumor cells (lymphoma, retinoblastoma, choroidal melanoma). The underlying etiology of the inflammation must be determined so that appropriate treatment can be given.

== Classification ==
The degree of vitritis is graded on a 1 to 4 scale depending upon how limited the view of the retinal structures is (i.e., 1 + = few cells with mild obscuration of the retina; 2 + = nerve and vessels visible; 3 + = only nerve and large vessels visible; 4 + = nerve and vessels not visible).
