= Eales disease =

- Specialty: Ophthalmology

Eales disease is a type of obliterative vasculopathy, also known as angiopathia retinae juvenilis, periphlebitis retinae or primary perivasculitis of the retina. It was first described by the British ophthalmologist Henry Eales (1852–1913) in 1880 and is a rare ocular disease characterized by inflammation and possible blockage of retinal blood vessels, abnormal growth of new blood vessels (neovascularization), and recurrent retinal and vitreal hemorrhages.

The disease is identified by its three characteristic steps: vasculitis, occlusion, and retinal neovascularization, leading to recurrent vitreous hemorrhages and vision loss. Eales Disease with a characteristic clinical picture, fluorescein angiographic finding, and natural course is considered a specific disease entity. The exact cause of this disease is unknown but it appears to affect individuals that are from Asian subcontinents. This disease tends to begin between the ages of 20 and 30 years and begins with unilateral peripheral retinal perivasculitis and peripheral retinal capillary non-perfusion. These are not normally recognized until the inflammation results in vitreous hemorrhage. This disease has been found to affect the second eye 50-90% of the time so there is a large chance that both eyes will begin to show signs of the disease.

== Presentation ==
Patients are often asymptomatic in the initial stages of retinal perivasculitis. Some may develop symptoms such as floaters, blurring vision, or even gross diminution of vision due to massive vitreous hemorrhage. Vision in these patients can be normal to hand movements or light perception only. Bilaterality is quite common (50–90%) in patients.

Signs of Eales disease include: visible inflammation in the blood vessels in the eyes (vasculitis) and the rupturing of blood vessels (vitreous hemorrhages). There may also be other signs that are identified via eye examination that can show retinal tears and retinal detachment that can lead to disruption of vision and blindness (though this is rare). Epiretinal membranes (ERM) can also be found on patients where the disease has progressed along to retinal detachment, Rubeosis iridis, neovascular glaucoma, cataracts, and optic atrophy.Symptoms of Eales disease include: mild reduction in vision due to vitreous hemorrhages, headaches, dyspepsia, constipation, and epistaxis. Eye floaters may develop indicating the possibility of the progression of the disease to a point where retinal detachment is a concern.The only variation in the signs and symptoms seems to come from the varying severity of vasculitis and damage done to the eyes from vitreous hemorrhages causing different levels of vision deficiencies.

== Aetiology ==
The cause of this condition is not known. However, in a significant number of patients, DNA of the bacterium Mycobacterium tuberculosis has been detected by PCR. Eales disease exact causes are not known. There have been some studies that implicate T-cells in the onset of the vasculitis, indicating that there may be an autoimmune factor to this disease. The exact event that causes the symptoms to begin are not known though Eales has been found to be associated with the tuberculosis bacteria (Mycobacterium tuberculosis). Through examination of samples taken from epiretinal membrane (ERM), genetic similarities with the bacteria have been found. Samples were taken into culture and the bacteria was not able to be cultured or isolated indicating that the bacteria is most likely not present, but this does not rule out the presence of genetic similarities. In result, the exact causes are unknown and further research is needed to determine the exact events and causes that lead to the development of the disease.

== Pathology ==
It is characterized by three overlapping stages of venous inflammation (vasculitis), occlusion, and retinal neovascularization. The exact mechanism is not known but it has been preposed that T-cells play a role in the inflammation that begins in the eye. Vascular endothelial growth factor (VEGF) is found in an increased amount in patients with ED and explains the increase in vascularization within the eye. Neovascularization is stimulated by hypoxia or ischemia.

== Diagnosis ==
Diagnosis of Eales Disease is mainly clinical with exclusion. Diagnosis of this disease can be complete through several different diagnostic tests. These tests include fundus fluorescein angiography (FFA) and ocular coherence tomography (OCT). FFA is used to identify Retinal periphlebitis (inflammation of the peripheral blood vessels in the eye) or peripheral non-perfusion. OCT is a noninvasive way to view the retina and identify macular edema, neovascularization, and hemorrhage.

The diagnosis of Eales disease can be broken down into several stages due to the regular progression of the disease.

Stage	Description
I	Periphlebitis of small (Ia) and large (Ib) caliber vessels with superficial retinal hemorrhages
IIa	Capillary non-perfusion
IIb	Revascularization elsewhere/of the disc
IIIa	Fibrovascular proliferation
IIIb	Vitreous hemorrhage
IVa	Traction/combined rhegmatogenous retinal detachment
IVb	Rubeosis iridis, neovascular glaucoma, complicated cataract, and optic atrophy

=== Differential diagnosis ===
There are many other ailments that show similar symptoms to ED. Differential diagnosis are as follows; retinopathy of prematurity (ROP) sequelae, familial exudative vitreoretinopathy, sarcoidosis, Behçet disease, sickle cell anemia, Terson syndrome, post traumatic vitreous hemorrhage, juvenile diabetes and primary branch retinal vein occlusion.

== Treatment ==
Treatment of Eales Disease comprises:

1. Medical treatment: A course of oral corticosteroids for extended periods is the mainstay of treatment during active inflammation. A course of antitubercular therapy has also been recommended in selective cases.

2. Laser photocoagulation of the retina is indicated in stage of neovascularizion.

3. Vitreoretinal surgery is required for nonresolving vitreous haemorrhage and tractional retinal detachment.
•If active TB is present - treat with ATT
•otherwise manage the vitreous hemorrhage -
Partial h'ge - postural management with propped up position
Total h'ge - Pars Plana Vitrectomy

== Epidemiology ==
Eales Disease most commonly affects healthy young adults. Male predominance (up to 97.6%) has been reported in a majority of the series, however one study reported that men and women are affected equally. The predominant age of onset of symptoms is between 20 and 40 years. The disease is now seen most commonly in the Indian subcontinent and its global incidence appears to be declining, probably largely due to improved public health and nutrition.
