= Synechia (eye) =

Condition in which the iris adheres to the cornea or lens

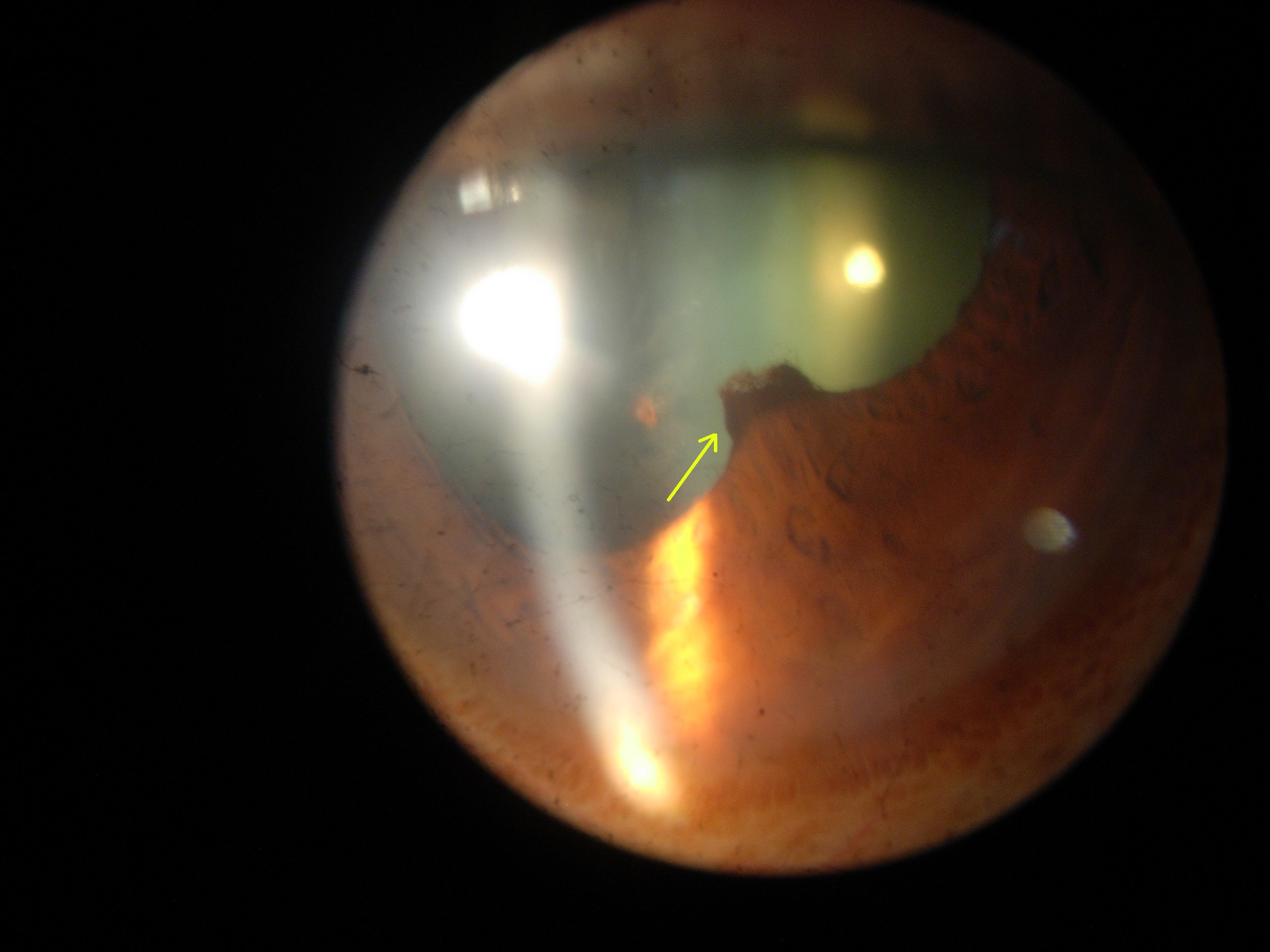
- Posterior synechia showing part of iris adherent to the lens
- Specialty: Ophthalmology

Misshapen pupil due to Iritis-caused synechia in the left eye

Ocular synechia is an eye condition where the iris adheres to either the cornea (i.e. anterior synechia) or lens (i.e. posterior synechia). Synechiae can be caused by ocular trauma, iritis or iridocyclitis and may lead to certain types of glaucoma. It is sometimes visible on careful examination but usually more easily through an ophthalmoscope or slit-lamp.

Anterior synechia causes closed angle glaucoma, which means that the iris closes the drainage way of aqueous humour which in turn raises the intraocular pressure. Posterior synechia can be observed in cases of anterior uveitis secondary to severe to moderate bacterial keratitis. Posterior synechia also cause glaucoma, but with a different mechanism. In posterior synechia, the iris adheres to the lens, blocking the flow of aqueous humor from the posterior chamber to the anterior chamber. This blocked drainage raises the intraocular pressure.

== Management ==
Mydriatic or cycloplegic agents, such as topical homatropine, which is similar in action to atropine, are useful in breaking and preventing the formation of posterior synechia by keeping the iris dilated and away from the crystalline lens. Dilation of the pupil in an eye with synechia can cause the pupil to take an irregular, non-circular shape (dyscoria) as shown in the photograph. If the pupil can be fully dilated during the treatment of iritis, the prognosis for recovery from synechia is good. This is a treatable status.

To subdue inflammation, topical corticosteroids can be used. A prostaglandin analogue, such as travoprost, may be used if the intra-ocular pressure is elevated.
