= Birdshot chorioretinopathy =

Birdshot chorioretinopathy (HLA-A29 uveitis)
- Other names: Multiple small, cream-colored lesions, symmetrically scattered mainly around the optic disk, Vitiliginous choroiditis
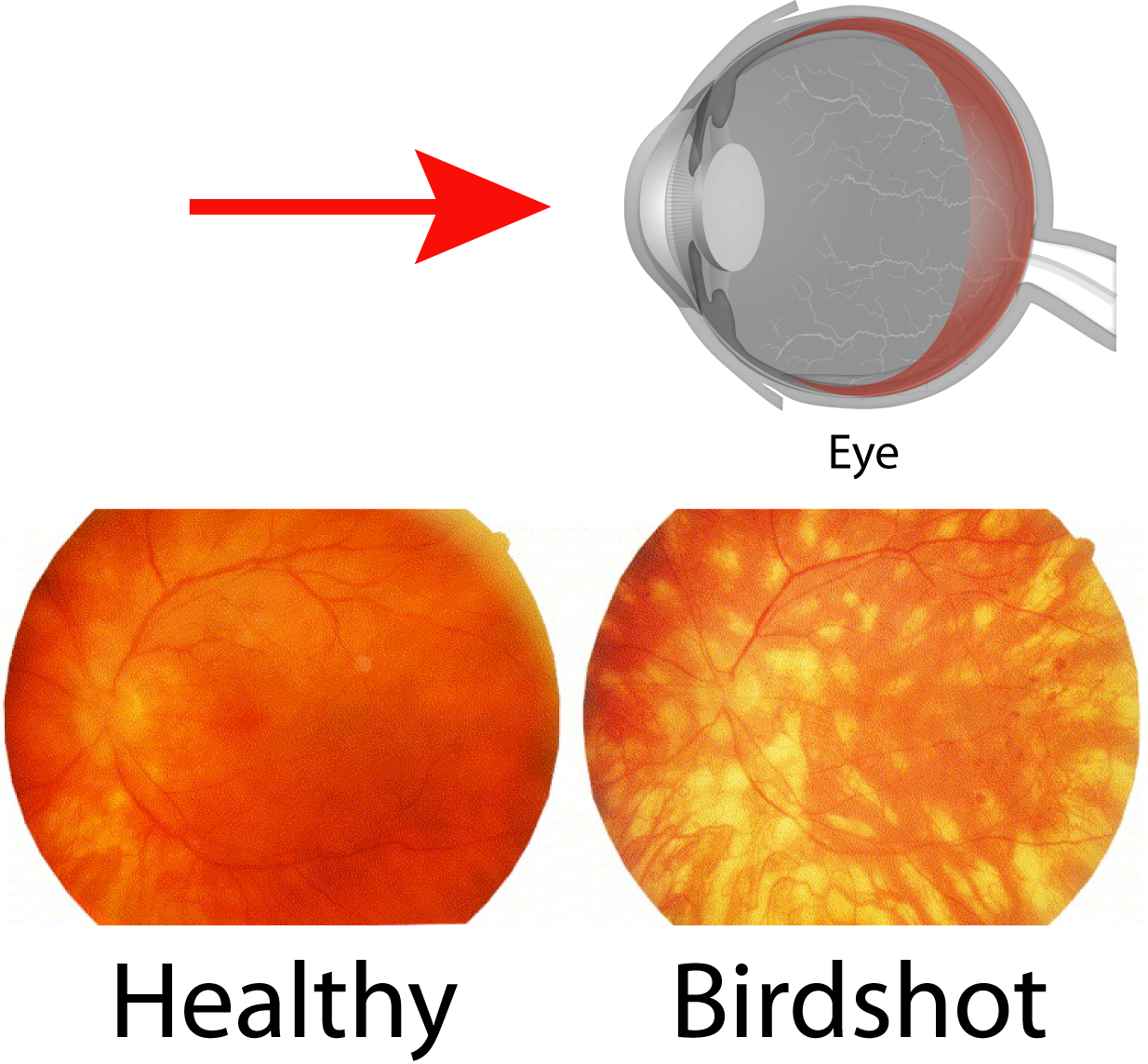
- Characteristic hypo-pigmentation in birdshot chorioretinopathy
- Specialty: Ophthalmology

Birdshot chorioretinopathy, now commonly named birdshot uveitis or HLA-A29 uveitis, is a rare form of bilateral posterior uveitis affecting both eyes. It causes severe, progressive inflammation of both the choroid and retina.

Affected individuals are almost exclusively Caucasian and usually diagnosed in the fourth to sixth decade of their lives.

== Symptoms and signs ==
Symptoms of this disorder include floaters, blurred vision, photopsia (flashing lights in eyes), loss of color vision and nyctalopia. In an eye examination, light-colored spots on the retina are seen. Complete loss of visual acuity may happen The name of the condition comes from the small light-colored fundus spots on the retina, scattered in a pattern like birdshot from a shotgun, but these spots might not be present in early stages.

== Pathophysiology ==
Birdshot chorioretinopathy is a rare form of posterior uveitis and accounts for 1–3% of uveitis cases in general. Birdshot chorioretinopathy is thought to be an autoimmune disease. The disease has strong association with the human leukocyte antigen haplotype (HLA)-A29, which is the strongest association between a disease and HLA class I documented (>99% of patients are HLA-A29 positive by molecular testing and HLA-A29-negative cases are controversial). This indicates a role for T-lymphocytes in the pathogenesis. Birdshot chorioretinopathy is associated with IL-17, a hallmark cytokine of TH17 cells that play an important role in autoimmunity. The disease affects typically middle-aged or elderly caucasians. HLA-A29 is less prevalent in Asia and no birdshot chorioretinopathy cases have been reported in Asia. When birdshot chorioretinopathy is suspected, a person is usually tested to determine if they are HLA-A29 positive. Although previously HLA-A29 testing was not considered necessary for definitive diagnosis, because HLA-A29 is also common in the general healthy population (7%). An increasing number of specialists consider the presence of HLA-A29 critical for diagnosis. Additional (genetic or environmental) or unknown factors may be associated with HLA-A29 in the pathogenesis.

In 2014, Kuiper et al. conducted a genome-wide association study in birdshot chorioretinopathy and studied the entire genome of Dutch, Spanish and English patients. This large genetic study ascertained HLA-A29:02 as the primary risk factor and identified the endoplasmic reticulum aminopeptidase (ERAP) 2 gene strongly associated with birdshot chorioretinopathy. Genetic variants near ERAP2 on chromosome 5 resulted in high mRNA and protein expression of this aminopeptidase in BSCR patients. ERAP2 is an aminopeptidase that, together with the closely related ERAP1, trims peptides in the endoplasmic reticulum and loads these peptides on HLA molecules for presentation to T cells of the immune system. ERAP-HLA associations have also been reported in Ankylosing spondylitis and Behcet's disease, suggesting shared pathogenic pathways among these diseases. The combined Birdshot risk polymorphisms at 5q15 linked to ERAP1 and ERAP2 genes (T-rs10044354-C-rs2287987) are only observed in HLA-A29-positive individuals in populations in which BU is "endemic", explaining why BU is reported merely in populations of Western European Ancestry (Spain, France, The Netherlands, Great Britain, but also non-European countries such as Puerto Rico). Functional analysis of patient-derived immune cells revealed that ERAP2 increases the abundance of peptides that specifically bind to HLA-A29 and further supports that the antigen presentation pathway drives the etiology of BSCR.

== Treatment ==
Birdshot chorioretinopathy may show resistance to treatment. Immunosuppressant therapy along with oral corticosteroid has been somewhat effective in slowing down the progressive inflammation associated with the disorder, preserving visual integrity as much as possible. Long-term use of such medications must be closely monitored, however, due to the discomforting and potentially debilitating and life-threatening side-effects.

Immunosuppressive drugs such as the therapeutic monoclonal antibody daclizumab, ciclosporin, methotrexate and Adalimumab, sold under the trade name Humira, have proven to be effective treatment options for birdshot chorioretinopathy. Substantial reduction and even stabilization of both vitreous inflammation and retinal vasculitis have been evident via electroretinography, during daclizumab (IL-2 receptor blocker) therapy. This is also supported by the observation of elevated levels of IL-2 in the eyes of patients. Loss of visual acuity unrelated to the inflammation caused by the disorder, however, often remains unchanged despite usage of the drug. This is reflected by the lack of difference in visual acuity and the vision-related quality of life among various treatment categories in birdshot patients. Contraindications and adverse side-effects are always a factor, as well.

A corticosteroid implant surgically placed within the eye can be used for patients who are not able to achieve remission on or tolerate immunomodulatory therapy, or in cases where this option presents less of a burden on life than long-term medical therapy.
