= Retinopathy =

Damage to the retina of the eyes

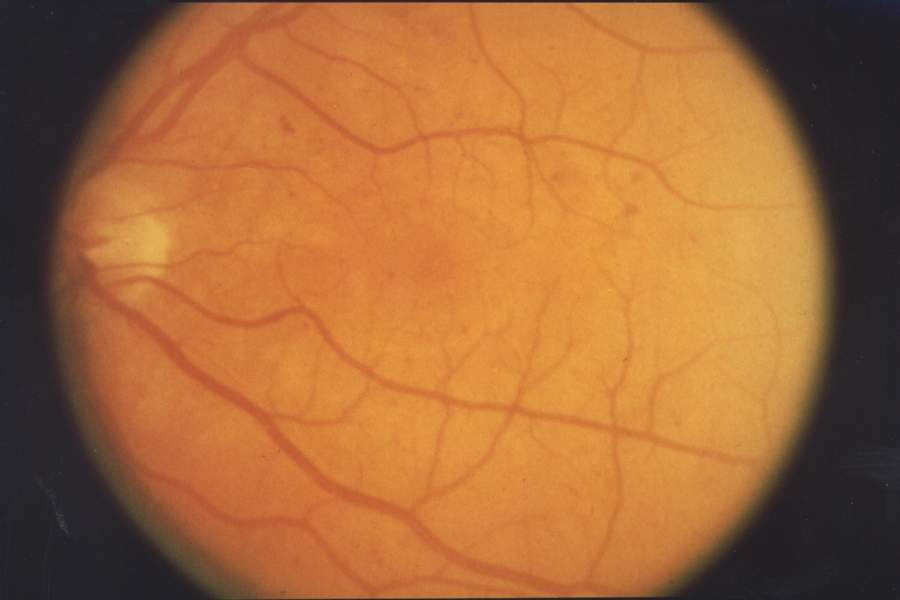
- Retinopathy in fundus of eye
- Specialty: Ophthalmology

Retinopathy is any damage to the retina of the eyes, which may cause vision impairment. Retinopathy often refers to retinal vascular disease, or damage to the retina caused by abnormal blood flow. Age-related macular degeneration is technically included under the umbrella term retinopathy but is often discussed as a separate entity. Retinopathy, or retinal vascular disease, can be broadly categorized into proliferative and non-proliferative types. Frequently, retinopathy is an ocular manifestation of systemic disease as seen in diabetes or hypertension. Diabetes is the most common cause of retinopathy in the U.S. as of 2008. Diabetic retinopathy is the leading cause of blindness in working-aged people. It accounts for about 5% of blindness worldwide and is designated a priority eye disease by the World Health Organization.

== Signs and symptoms ==
Many people often do not have symptoms until very late in their disease course. Patients often become symptomatic when there is irreversible damage. Symptoms are usually not painful and can include:

- Vitreous hemorrhage
- Floaters, or small objects that drift through the field of vision
- Decreased visual acuity
- "Curtain falling" over eyes

== Pathophysiology ==
The development of retinopathy can be broken down into proliferative and non-proliferative types. Both types cause disease by altering the normal blood flow to the retina through different mechanisms. The retina is supplied by small vessel branches from the central retinal artery. Proliferative retinopathy refers to damage caused by abnormal blood vessel growth. Normally, angiogenesis is a natural part of tissue growth and formation. When there is an unusually high or fast rate of angiogenesis, there is an overgrowth of blood vessels called neovascularization. In the non-proliferative type, abnormal blood flow to the retina occurs due to direct damage or compromise of the blood vessels themselves. Many causes of retinopathy may cause both proliferative and non-proliferative types, though some causes are more associated one type.

=== Non-proliferative retinopathy ===
Non-proliferative retinopathy is often caused by direct damage or remodeling of the small blood vessels supplying the retina. Many common causes of non-proliferative damage include hypertensive retinopathy, retinopathy of prematurity, radiation retinopathy, solar retinopathy, sickle cell retinopathy, and anemic retinopathy (including secondary to vitamin B12 deficiency).

There are three main mechanisms of damage in non-proliferative retinopathy: blood vessel damage or remodeling, direct retinal damage, or occlusion of the blood vessels. The first mechanism is indirect damage by altering the blood vessels that supply the retina. In the case of hypertension, high pressures in the system cause the walls of the artery to thicken, which effectively reduces the amount of blood flow to the retina. This reduction in flow causes tissue ischemia leading to damage. Atherosclerosis, or hardening and narrowing of blood vessels, also reduces flow to the retina. The second mechanism is direct damage to the retina usually caused by free radicals that causes oxidative damage to the retina itself. Radiation, solar retinopathy, and retinopathy of prematurity fall under this category. The third common mechanism is occlusion of blood flow. This can be caused by either physically blocking the vessels of the retinal artery branches or causing the arteries to narrow. Again, the result is reduced blood flow to the retina causing tissue damage. Sickle cell disease compromises blood flow by causing blood to sludge, or thicken and flow slowly, through the retinal arteries. Other disorders that cause hyperviscosity syndrome may also cause blood sludging. Lastly, clots or central artery thrombosis directly blocks flow to the retina causing the cells to die.

=== Proliferative retinopathy ===
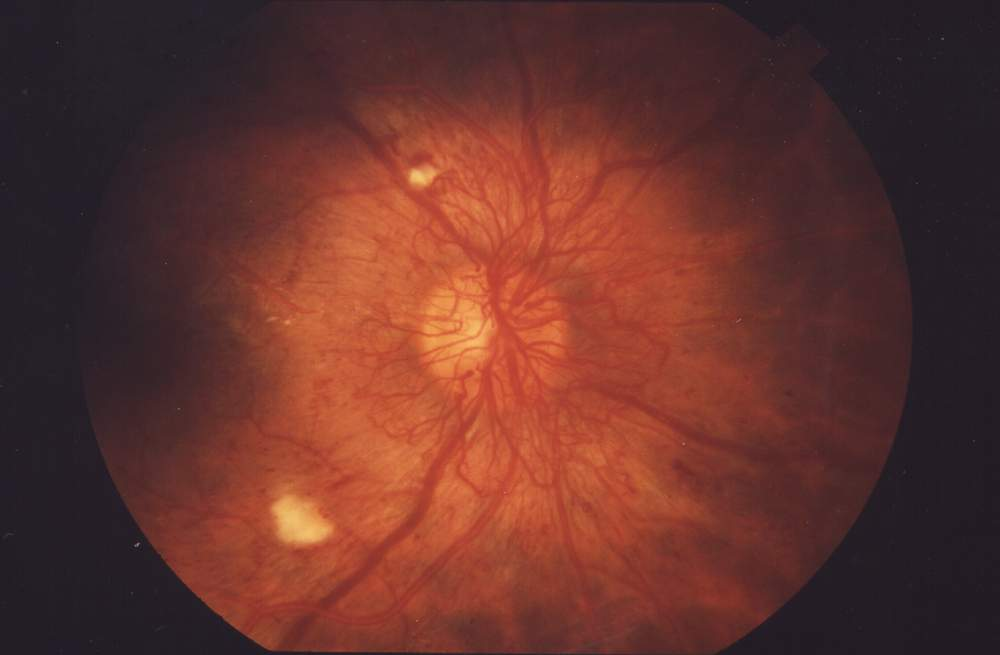
Proliferative retinopathy during exam

Proliferative retinopathy is the result of aberrant blood flow to the retina due to blood vessel overgrowth, or neovascularization. These pathologically overgrown blood vessels are often fragile, weak, and ineffective at perfusing the retinal tissues. These weak, fragile vessels are also often leaky, allowing fluids, protein, and other debris to leach out into the retina. They are also prone to hemorrhage due to their poor strength. This makes proliferative types of retinopathy more risky since vessel hemorrhaging often leads to vision loss and blindness. Many of the causes mentioned in non-proliferative retinopathy may also cause proliferative retinopathy at later stages. Angiogenesis and neovascularization tend to be a later manifestation of non-proliferative retinopathy. Many types of non-proliferative retinopathies result in tissue ischemia or direct retinal damage. The body responds by trying to increase blood flow to damaged retinal tissues. Diabetes mellitus, which causes diabetic retinopathy, is the most common cause of proliferative retinopathy in the world.

=== Other causes ===
Genetic mutations are rare causes of certain retinopathies and are usually X-linked including NDP family of genes causing Norrie disease, FEVR, and Coats disease among others. There is emerging evidence that there may be a genetic predisposition in patients who develop retinopathy of prematurity and diabetic retinopathy. Trauma, especially to the head, and several diseases may cause Purtscher's retinopathy. Physical exertion like weight lifting and aerobic exercise, coughing, sneezing, straining at stool, vomiting, sexual intercourse, blowing up balloons, blowing musical instruments, cardiopulmonary resuscitation or compression injuries may cause valsalva retinopathy.

== Diagnosis ==
Retinopathy is diagnosed by an ophthalmologist or an optometrist during eye examination. The clinician will need to examine the retina, at the back of the eye, to make this diagnosis. There are several ways to examine the retina. The clinician can directly view the retina by looking through the pupil with a light. In most cases, the clinician will dilate the pupil to make for better visualization. Stereoscopic fundus photography is the gold standard for the diagnosis of retinopathy.

Telemedicine programs are available that allow primary care clinics to take images using specially designed retinal imaging equipment which can then be shared electronically with specialists at other locations for review. In 2009, Community Health Center, Inc. implemented a telemedicine retinal screening program for low-income patients with diabetes as part of those patients' annual visits at the Federally Qualified Health Center.

== Prevention ==
Retinopathy is often secondary to diseases such as diabetes or hypertension. Controlling blood sugar levels and blood pressure have been shown to help decrease incidence of retinopathy.

Blood sugar control: If someone has diabetes, or is at high risk for diabetes, it is important for them to have their blood sugar levels checked. The gold standard blood sugar test is the HbA1C test. Many studies have suggested that lowering HbA1C levels in someone with elevated HbA1C levels can lower the incidence and progression of retinopathy. Fortunately, blood sugar control can have benefits beyond just the eye. A primary care physician can help with blood sugar control strategies.

Blood pressure control: Controlling blood pressure can also lower the incidence and progression of retinopathy. A primary care physician can help with blood pressure control strategies.

Other: Besides blood sugar and blood pressure control, there are other modifications that can help. Regular exercise may help lower the incidence and progression of retinopathy. If someone has sleep apnea, treatment of sleep apnea may help as well.

== Treatment ==
Treatment is based on the cause of the retinopathy and may include laser therapy to the retina. Laser photocoagulation therapy has been the standard treatment for many types of retinopathy. Evidence shows that laser therapy is generally safe and improves visual symptoms in sickle cell and diabetic retinopathy. In recent years targeting the pathway controlling vessel growth or angiogenesis has been promising. Vascular endothelial growth factor (VEGF) seems to play a vital role in promoting neovascularization. Using anti-VEGF drugs (antibodies to sequester the growth factor), research have shown significant reduction in the extent of vessel outgrowth. Low quality evidence supports the use of anti-VEGF antibodies, such as bevacizumab or pegaptanib which seems to improve outcomes when used in conjunction with laser therapy to treat retinopathy of prematurity, longer term systemic effects are not known however. The evidence is poorer for treatment of diabetic retinopathy. Use of anti-VEGF drugs did not appear to improve outcomes in a clinically significant way when compared to standard laser therapy for diabetic retinopathy.

== Epidemiology ==
The two most common causes of retinopathy include diabetic retinopathy and retinopathy of prematurity. Diabetic retinopathy affects about 5 million people and retinopathy of prematurity affect about 50,000 premature infants each year worldwide. Hypertensive retinopathy is the next most common cause affecting anywhere from 3 to 14% of all non-diabetic adults.

== See also ==
- List of eye diseases and disorders
- List of systemic diseases with ocular manifestations
- Chloroquine retinopathy
