= Acute visual loss =

Loss of visual acuity associated with illness or aging

- Other names: Acute vision loss
- A Snellen chart, which is frequently used for visual acuity testing

Acute visual loss is a rapid loss of the ability to see. It is caused by many ocular conditions like retinal detachment, glaucoma, macular degeneration, and giant cell arteritis, etc.

Video explanation (script)

== Main causes ==
=== Retinal detachment ===
Retinal detachment should be considered if there were preceding flashes or floaters, or if there is a new visual field defect in one eye. If treated early enough, retinal tear and detachment can have a good outcome.

=== Glaucoma ===
Angle-closure glaucoma should be considered if there is painful loss of vision with a red eye, nausea or vomiting. The eye pressure will be very high typically greater than 40 mmHg. Emergent laser treatment to the iris may prevent blindness.

=== Macular degeneration ===
Wet macular degeneration should be considered in older people with new distortion of their vision with bleeding in the macula. Vision can often be regained with prompt eye injections with anti-VEGF agents.

=== Giant cell arteritis ===
Giant cell arteritis should be considered in an older person with jaw claudication, temporal pain, and tiredness. Placing the person on steroids might save both their vision and decrease their risk of stroke. Without treatment a person can quickly go blind in both eyes.

=== Vascular occlusions ===
- Central retinal artery occlusion: CRAO is characterized by painless, acute vision loss in one eye.
- Central retinal vein occlusion: CRVO causes sudden, painless vision loss that can be mild to severe.
- Branch retinal vein occlusion: sudden painless vision loss or visual field defect are the main symptom of BRVO.
- Branch retinal artery occlusion: BRAO may also cause acute painless loss of vision.

=== Vitreous hemorrhage ===
It is one of the most common causes of acute or subacute decrease in vision.

=== Hyphema ===
Blood in the anterior chamber of the eye is known as hyphema. Severe hyphema covering pupillary area can cause sudden decrease in vision.
