= Complications of hypertension =

Medical conditions

Main complications of persistent high blood pressure

Complications of hypertension are clinical outcomes that result from persistent elevation of blood pressure. Hypertension is a risk factor for all clinical manifestations of atherosclerosis since it is a risk factor for atherosclerosis itself. It is an independent predisposing factor for heart failure, coronary artery disease, stroke, kidney disease, and peripheral arterial disease. It is the most important risk factor for cardiovascular morbidity and mortality, in industrialized countries.

== Complications affecting the heart ==
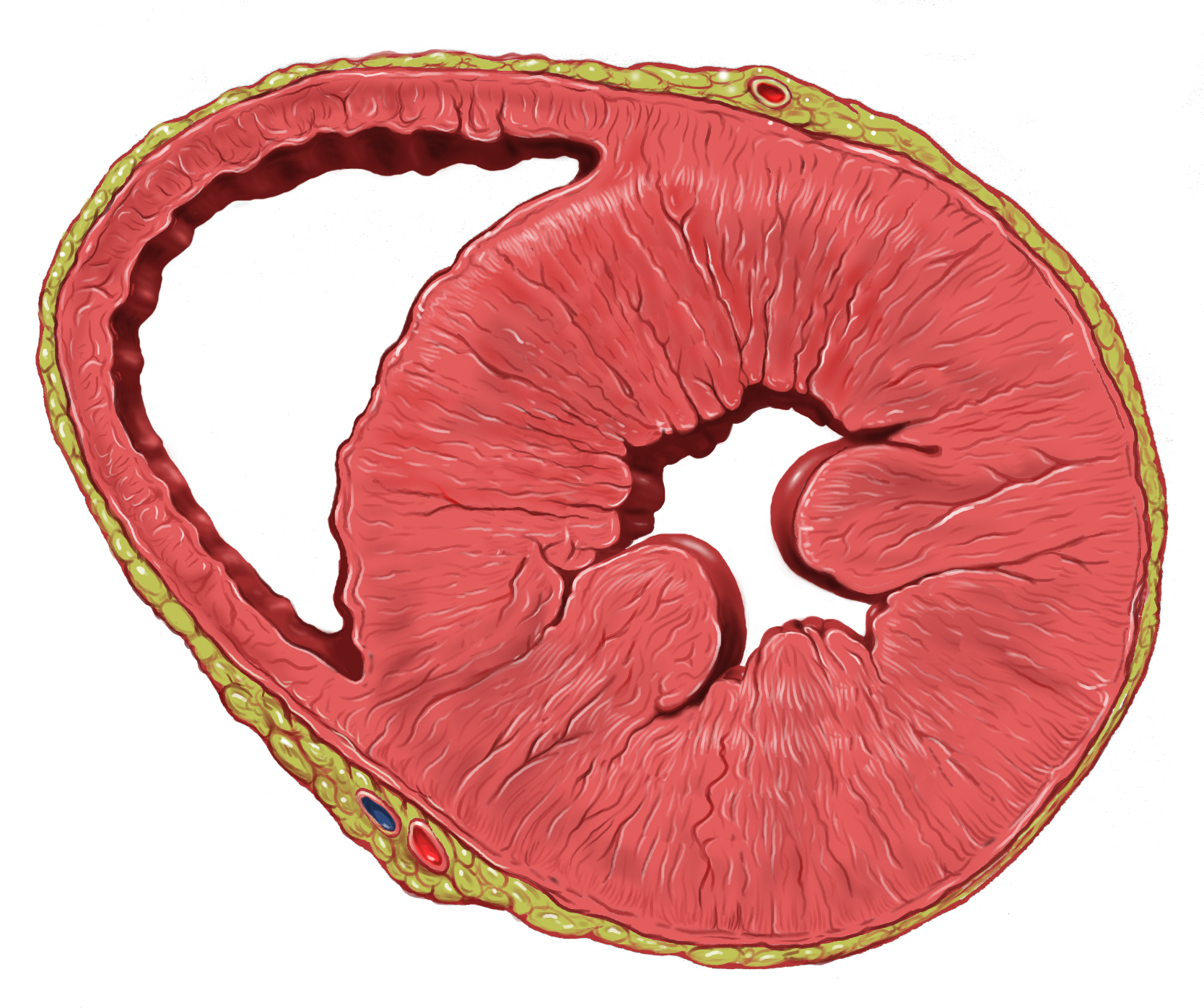
Left ventricular hypertrophy

Hypertensive heart disease is the result of structural and functional adaptations leading to left ventricular hypertrophy, diastolic dysfunction, CHF (Congestive Heart Failure), abnormalities of blood flow due to atherosclerotic coronary artery disease and microvascular disease, and cardiac arrhythmias. Individuals with left ventricular hypertrophy are at increased risk for, stroke, CHF, and sudden death. Aggressive control of hypertension can regress or reverse left ventricular hypertrophy and reduce the risk of cardiovascular disease. left ventricular hypertrophy are seen in 25% of the hypertensive patients and can easily be diagnosed by using echocardiography. Underlying mechanisms of hypertensive left ventricular hypertrophy are of 2 types: firstly, mechanical (mainly leading to myocyte hypertrophy) and secondly, neuro-hormonal(mainly resulting in a fibroblastic proliferation).

Abnormalities of diastolic function, ranging from asymptomatic heart disease to overt heart failure, are common in hypertensive patients. Patients with diastolic heart failure have a preserved ejection fraction, which is a measure of systolic function. Diastolic dysfunction is an early consequence of hypertension-related heart disease and is exacerbated by left ventricular hypertrophy and ischemia.

== Complications affecting the brain ==
Hypertension is an important risk factor for brain infarction and hemorrhage. Approximately 85% of strokes are due to infarction and the remainder are due to hemorrhage, either intracerebral hemorrhage or subarachnoid hemorrhage. The incidence of stroke rises progressively with increasing blood pressure levels, particularly systolic blood pressure in individuals >65 years. Treatment of hypertension convincingly decreases the incidence of both ischemic and hemorrhagic strokes.

Hypertension is also associated with impaired cognition in an aging population. Hypertension-related cognitive impairment and dementia may be a consequence of a single infarct due to occlusion of a "strategic" larger vessel or multiple lacunar infarcts due to occlusive small vessel disease resulting in subcortical white matter ischemia. Several clinical trials suggest that antihypertensive therapy has a beneficial effect on cognitive function, although this remains an active area of investigation.

Cerebral blood flow remains unchanged over a wide range of arterial pressures (mean arterial pressure of 50–150 mmHg) through a process termed autoregulation of blood flow. Signs and symptoms of hypertensive encephalopathy may include severe headache, nausea and vomiting (often of a projectile nature), focal neurologic signs, and alterations in mental status. Untreated, hypertensive encephalopathy may progress to stupor, coma, seizures, and death within hours. It is important to distinguish hypertensive encephalopathy from other neurologic syndromes that may be associated with hypertension, e.g., cerebral ischemia, hemorrhagic or thrombotic stroke, seizure disorder, mass lesions, pseudotumor cerebri, delirium tremens, meningitis, acute intermittent porphyria, traumatic or chemical injury to the brain, and uremic encephalopathy.

== Complications affecting the eye ==
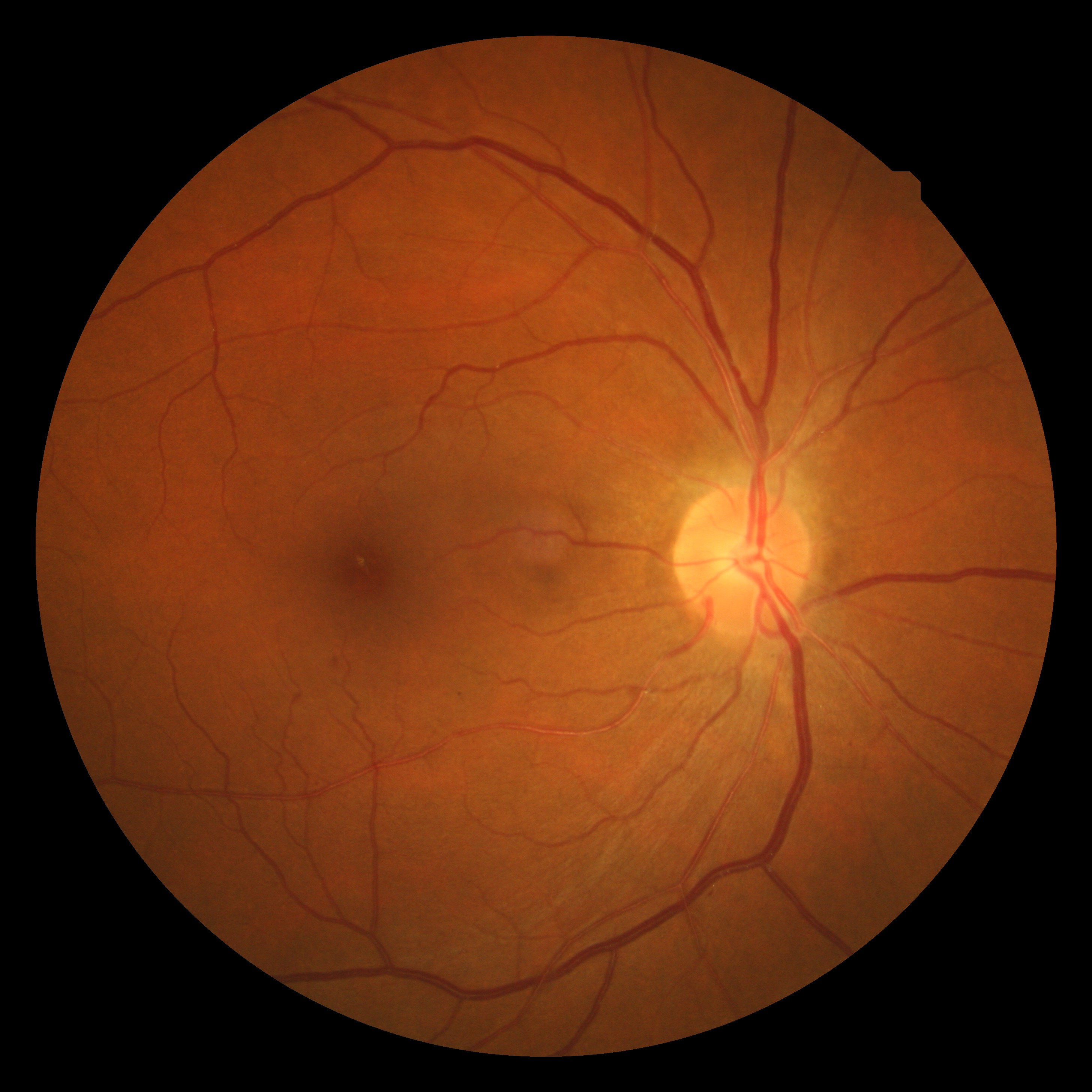
Hypertensive retinopathy with AV nicking and mild vascular tortuosity

Hypertensive retinopathy is a condition characterized by a spectrum of retinal vascular signs in people with elevated blood pressure. It was first described by Liebreich in 1859. The retinal circulation undergoes a series of pathophysiological changes in response to elevated blood pressure. In the initial, vasoconstrictive stage, there is vasospasm and an increase in retinal arteriolar tone owing to local autoregulatory mechanisms. This stage is seen clinically as a generalized narrowing of the retinal arterioles. Persistently elevated blood pressure leads to intimal thickening, hyperplasia of the media wall, and hyaline degeneration in the subsequent, sclerotic, stage. This stage corresponds to more severe generalized and focal areas of arteriolar narrowing, changes in the arteriolar and venular junctions, and alterations in the arteriolar light reflex (i.e., widening and accentuation of the central light reflex, or "copper wiring").

This is followed by an exudative stage, in which there is disruption of the blood–retina barrier, necrosis of the smooth muscles and endothelial cells, exudation of blood and lipids, and retinal ischemia. These changes are manifested in the retina as microaneurysms, hemorrhages, hard exudates, and cotton-wool spots. Swelling of the optic disk may occur at this time and usually indicates severely elevated blood pressure (i.e., malignant hypertension). Because better methods for the control of blood pressure are now available in the general population, malignant hypertension is rarely seen. In contrast, other retinal vascular complications of hypertension, such as macroaneurysms and branch-vein occlusions, are not uncommon in patients with chronically elevated blood pressure. These stages of hypertensive retinopathy however, may not be sequential. For example, signs of retinopathy that reflect the exudative stage, such as retinal hemorrhage or microaneurysm, may be seen in eyes that do not have features of the sclerotic stage,

== Complications affecting the kidneys ==
Hypertension is a risk factor for chronic kidney disease and end-stage kidney disease (ESKD). Kidney risk appears to be more closely related to systolic than to diastolic blood pressure, and black men are at greater risk than white men for developing ESRD at every level of blood pressure.

The atherosclerotic, hypertension-related vascular lesions in the kidney primarily affect the preglomerular arterioles, resulting in ischemic changes in the glomeruli and postglomerular structures. Glomerular injury may also be a consequence of direct damage to the glomerular capillaries due to glomerular hyperperfusion. Glomerular pathology progresses to glomerulosclerosis, and eventually the kidney tubules may also become ischemic and gradually atrophic. The kidney lesion associated with malignant hypertension consists of fibrinoid necrosis of the afferent arterioles, sometimes extending into the glomerulus, and may result in focal necrosis of the glomerular tuft.

Clinically, macroalbuminuria (a random urine albumin/creatinine ratio > 300 mg/g) or microalbuminuria (a random urine albumin/creatinine ratio 30–300 mg/g) are early markers of kidney injury. These are also risk factors for kidney disease progression and for cardiovascular disease.

== Complications associated to diabetes and hypertension ==
Diabetes has several complications of which one is hypertension or high blood pressure. Data indicate that at least 60-80 percent of individuals whom develop diabetes will eventually develop high blood pressure. The high blood pressure is gradual at early stages and may take at least 10–15 years to fully develop. Besides diabetes, other factors that may also increase high blood pressure include obesity, insulin resistance and high cholesterol levels. In general, fewer than 25 percent of diabetics have good control of their blood pressure. The presence of high blood pressure in diabetes is associated with a 4 fold increase in death chiefly from heart disease and strokes. It has also been shown in recent epidemiological studies that variability of blood pressure, independent of mean blood pressure level, contributes to microvascular and macrovascular complications in those with diabetes, including heart failure. These variability associations may be especially deleterious in persons with either particularly high or particularly low blood pressures.

The chief reason why people with diabetes develop high blood pressure is hardening of the arteries. Diabetes tends to speed up the process of atherosclerosis. The other fact about diabetes is that it affects both large and small blood vessels in the body. Over time, blood vessels become clogged with fatty depots, become non-compliant and lose their elasticity. The process of atherosclerosis is a lot faster in diabetic individuals whom do not have good control of their blood sugars. The high blood pressure eventually leads to heart failure, strokes, heart attacks, blindness, kidney failure, loss of libido and poor circulation of blood in the legs. When the blood supply to the feet is compromised, the chances of infections and amputations also increases. All diabetics should know that even mild elevations in blood pressure can be detrimental to health. Studies have shown that diabetics with even a slight elevation in blood pressure have 2-3 times the risk of heart disease compared to individuals without diabetes.

Blood pressure readings do vary but experts recommend that blood pressure should not range above 140/80. Secondly, high blood pressure is a silent disease and thus it is vital for all diabetics to regularly check their blood pressure or have it checked at a doctor's office on a regular basis. The American Diabetes Association recommends that all diabetics get their blood pressure measured by a health care professional at least 2-5 times a year.

=== Treatment for diabetic patients with hypertension ===
Once blood pressure is found to be high in diabetics, there are ways to treat it:

Medications like the Angiotensin-converting enzyme inhibitors (ACEI) are widely used to control blood pressure in diabetics. These medications not only control blood pressure but also delay or prevent the development of kidney disease in diabetes. Many studies have shown that ACEI should be the drugs of first choice in diabetics with high blood pressure. Other medications used to treat high blood pressure include water pills. Sometimes, a combination of medications is used to treat high blood pressure. All diabetics should quit smoking. The combination of diabetes and smoking usually leads to amputations of the toes and feet. Measure your blood sugars regularly, and make sure that they are well balanced as the majority of complications of diabetes can be prevented by ensuring such blood sugars stay within normal limits. It is also recommended to eat a healthy diet and avoid sugary foods and limit the intake of salt. Also, ensure that your cholesterol levels are under control. Exercise is a must for all diabetics. Walking twice a day for 30 minutes can be a fair substitute for those not engaged in intense gym activities. Losing weight is also beneficial as this has been shown to improve blood sugar control, increase insulin sensitivity and reduce blood pressure.
