= Vascular occlusion =

Blockage of a blood vessel

Vascular occlusion is a blockage of a blood vessel, usually with a clot. It differs from thrombosis in describing any form of blockage, not just one formed by a clot. When it occurs in a major vein, it can, in some cases, cause deep vein thrombosis. The condition is also relatively common in the retina, and can cause partial or total loss of vision. An occlusion can often be diagnosed using Doppler sonography (a form of ultrasound).

Some medical procedures, such as embolisation, involve occluding a blood vessel to treat a particular condition. This can be to reduce pressure on aneurysms (weakened blood vessels) or to restrict a haemorrhage. It can also be used to reduce blood supply to tumours or growths in the body, and therefore restrict their development. Occlusion can be carried out using a ligature; by implanting small coils which stimulate the formation of clots; or, particularly in the case of cerebral aneurysms, by clipping.

== See also ==
- Central retinal artery occlusion
- Central retinal vein occlusion
- Branch retinal artery occlusion
- Branch retinal vein occlusion
