= Sickle cell retinopathy =

- Specialty: Ophthalmology, optometry
- Complications: Blindness
- Causes: Sickle cell disease
- Risk factors: Heredity
- Diagnostic method: Eye examination
- Treatment: Medical, laser and surgery

Sickle cell retinopathy can be defined as retinal changes due to blood vessel damage in the eye of a person with a background of sickle cell disease. It can likely progress to loss of vision in late stages due to vitreous hemorrhage or retinal detachment. Sickle cell disease is a structural red blood cell disorder leading to consequences in multiple systems. It is characterized by chronic red blood cell destruction, vascular injury, and tissue ischemia causing damage to the brain, eyes, heart, lungs, kidneys, spleen, and musculoskeletal system.

People affected by sickle cell disease are commonly of African or Asian descent. Emigration patterns towards the Western Hemisphere have led to increased numbers of persons affected by sickle cell disease in regions where it was previously uncommon. Knowledge and understanding of sickle cell disease and its management are now increasingly relevant in areas such as the European Union. At a young age, a great proportion of people living with sickle cell disease can develop retinal changes. Sickle cell disease consists of several subtypes; however, the Haemoglobin type C (HbSC) subtype carries the gravest prognosis for sickle cell retinopathy and vision changes.

Regular retinal examinations can aid in early detection and treatment, thus reducing the impact of the condition and the risk of vision loss. Development and progression of sickle cell retinopathy can be favorably modified through management of the underling sickle cell disease. Treatment of the general disease can ameliorate its systemic effects.

== Classification ==
Sickle cell retinopathy can be classified based on retinal changes into non-proliferative and proliferative subtypes.

=== Non-proliferative sickle cell retinopathy (NPSCR) ===
Non-proliferative sickle cell retinopathy (NPSCR) can feature the following retinal manifestations:

- Venous tortuousity is commonly observed in patients with homozygous HbSS sickle cell disease. Numerous diseases that feature blood hyperviscosity similar to sickle cell disease can manifest as retinal venous tortuousity. Tortuosity is caused by arteriovenous shunting from the retinal periphery.
- It can feature small bleeds of the retina known as intra-retinal hemorrhages, due to blockage of blood vessels by the sickled blood cells, thus triggering vessel wall necrosis. The resulting hemorrhages are initially bright red and oval shaped. As the hemorrhage ages over a period of days to weeks, the color then changes to a salmon hue known as a salmon patch. They are usually seen adjacent to the retinal arteriole.
- Bleeding in the deeper layers of the retina leads to the appearance of dark lesions known as black sunburst spots. These oval or round shaped pigmented spots are formed due to RPE proliferation.
- As the haemoglobin within the hemorrhage breaks down over time, yellow spots known as iridescent bodies are formed within the layers of the sensory retina.
- Maculopathy occurs in a significant portion of patients affected by sickle cell retinopathy. It is more prevalent in homozygous HbSS type sickle cell disease. The fovea can be found within the macula and is known as the center of the visual field. Maculopathy in sickle cell retinopathy is due to long term changes of capillaries that interact at the fovea. Although ischemic changes may be apparent on the retina, maculopathy may be asymptomatic at first leaving visual acuity unchanged.
- Central retinal artery occlusion is a known feature of non-proliferative sickle cell retinopathy that has a low incidence in patients with non proliferative sickle cell retinopathy.
- Optic nerve sign is represented by dilated capillaries that can be visualized in the nerve using fluorescein angiography. Visual acuity often remains unchanged with this finding.
- Angioid streaks: Angioid streaks may be seen in up to 6% of cases.

=== Proliferative sickle cell retinopathy (PSCR) ===
Proliferative sickle retinopathy is the most severe ocular complication of sickle cell disease. Even though PSCR begins in the first decade of life, the condition remains asymptomatic and unnoticed until visual symptoms occur due to vitreous hemorrhage or retinal detachment.

==== Goldberg classification ====
Goldberg classified PSR into following 5 different self-explanatory stages:

1. Stage of peripheral arterial occlusion and ischemia: It is the earliest abnormality that can be visualized by fundus examination. The occluded arterioles can be seen as dark red lines. They eventually turn into white silver-wire vessels.
2. Stage of peripheral arteriolar-venular anastomoses: Arteriolar-venular anastomoses develop as blood is diverted from blocked arteries to nearby venules.
3. Stage of neovascularization and fibrous proliferation: Neovascularization starts from the arteriolar-venular anastomoses, and grow into the ischemic retina. Characteristic fan-shaped appearance due to neovasularization is known as sea fan neovascularization.
4. Stage of vitreous hemorrhage. Peripheral neovascular tufts bleed and cause vitreous hemorrhage.
5. Stage of vitreoretinal traction bands and tractional retinal detachment: Traction on the sea fan and adjacent retina causes traction retinal detachment.

== Signs and symptoms ==
- Comma sign: Comma shaped vessels in the bulbar conjunctiva is due to vascular occlusion of conjunctival vessels.
- Vitreoretinal traction or retinal detachment cause flashes, floaters or dark shadows.
- Sudden loss of vision may occur due to retinal artery occlusion, vitreous hemorrhage or retinal detachment.
- Intravascular occlusions may be seen in optic disc vessels.

== Cause ==
Normal adult hemoglobin A molecule comprises two α and two β globin chains associated with a heme ring. Mutation at the 6th position of the beta chain is the cause of sickle cell disease. Due to sickle cell disease, vascular occlusion may occur in the conjunctiva, iris, retina, or choroid. Retinal changes occur due to blockage of retinal blood vessels by abnormal RBCs.

== Diagnosis ==
Diagnosis is conducted in a multidisciplinary manner. The diagnosis of sickle cell disease can be confirmed by cation high performance liquid chromatography, haemoglobin electrophoresis in adolescents and adults and molecular genetic diagnosis in prenatal and neonatal populations. Anterior segment signs including the conjunctival sign and iris atrophy are ocular manifestations that are strongly indicative of sickle cell disease. Early stages of sickle cell retinopathy are asymptomatic. However, retinal changes that are diagnostic of sickle cell retinopathy can be visualized using fundoscopic examinations, retinography, fluorescein angiography and coherence tomography. Ultra Widefield Fluorescein Angiography is the gold standard for diagnosis of proliferative sickle cell retinopathy. It is an invasive method that assesses both anterior and posterior segment structures. Spectral Domain Optical Coherence Tomography and Coherence Tomography Angiography are non invasive methods of diagnosing proliferative retinopathy. Visual acuity and intraocular pressure assessments can also yield results that are diagnostic of sickle cell retinopathy.

=== Differential diagnosis ===
Sickle cell retinopathy should be differentiated from other retinal conditions that arise due to similar pathologies. The following differentials are classified by those pathologies.

- Additional causes of macular ischemia
1. Diabetic retinopathy
2. Retinal embolization (talc retinopathy, internal carotid artery embolism)
3. Retinal vascular occlusion
4. Infectious retinopathy
- Inflammatory diseases leading to ischemia
1. Sarcoidosis
2. Retinal vasculitis
3. Intermediate uveitis
4. Acute retinal necrosis
- Alternative causes of ischemic vascular disease
1. Proliferative diabetic retinopathy]
2. Central retinal vein occlusion
3. Branch retinal vein occlusion
4. Ocular ischemic syndrome
5. Radiation retinopathy
6. Retinopathy of prematurity
- Unclassified causes
1. Incontinentia pigmenti
2. Autosomal dominant vitreoretinochoroidopathy
3. Chronic rhegmatogenous retinal detachment
4. Scleral buckle
5. Retinitis pigmentosa

== Prevention ==
=== Screening ===
Screening is an important pillar of prevention of sickle cell retinopathy as it provides the benefit of early detection and treatment thus reducing complications. Screening also provides an opportunity for education of families predisposed to retinopathy as a result of a family history of sickle cell disease. Screening can take the form of DNA screening at birth and Ophthalmology-related examinations later in life.

1. DNA screening in newborns at risk of having sickle cell disease allows the early diagnosis of the disease. Families can then be educated on the possible effects of sickle cell disease at each stage of life.
2. Ophthalmology-related examinations - dilated fundoscopic examination is recommended from the age of 10 and biannually thereafter in patients with no abnormal retinal findings. Fluorescein angiography and angioscopy is recommended for patients with abnormal findings that may be indicative of proliferative sickle cell retinopathy. The frequency of follow up appointments is determined by the ophthalmologist based on the severity of the findings.

=== Care of systemic disease ===
Sickle cell disease is a systemic disease that affects several organs in the body. Management of the underlying disease can therefore prevent the development of retinopathy and slow its progression.

1. Fetal haemoglobin transfusion - Fetal haemoglobin (HbF) is a form of haemoglobin that is found in children up to 6 months after birth. This type of haemoglobin is beneficial in sickle cell patients as it resists modification to the sickled shape. As a result, transfusion of HbF in younger populations can prevent and slow the progression of sickle cell retinopathy.
2. Hydroxyurea administration - Hydroxyurea is a drug that can be used as an alternative method of increasing fetal haemoglobin levels in the blood of a patient with sickle cell disease. Hydroxyurea also provides the benefit of reducing inflammation.
3. Haematopoetic stem cell transplantation - This process is more commonly known as a bone marrow transplant. It is useful in the management of sickle cell disease. However, access to this method is limited due to cost and the need for a donor that is biologically compatible with the person requiring the transplant.
4. Anti-inflammatory and anti-adhesive drugs reduce the likelihood of occlusions in the small blood vessels of the retina therefore preventing the development of sickle cell retinopathy. There drugs include anti adhesive antibodies, anti-integrin antibodies, anti-Willebrand factor, sulfasalazine and statins.
5. Gene therapy has also been proven beneficial in the prevention of sickle cell retinopathy.

== Treatment ==
=== Medical ===
Vascular endothelial growth factor (VEGF) is known to be associated with sea fan lesions which are types of neovascularization. Bevacizumab is an anti-VEGF drug used in intravitreal injection that is known to cause reversal of sea fan lesions and reduce the duration of vitreous hemorrhage. Intravitreal injection of anti-VEGF drugs can also be used prior to surgery to aid separation of tissues involved in the sea fan lesion and to reduce intraoperative and postoperative hemorrhage. It is useful in combination with photocoagulation.

=== Laser ===
Indications for laser photocoagulation include

- Peripheral neovascularization of upwards of 60° circumference
- Sickle cell retinopathy affecting both eyes
- Large elevated sea fans
- Rapid progression of neovascularization

There are two methods of photocoagulation mainly used; feeder vessel coagulation and scatter laser coagulation. The first method closes the vessels that supply the neovascularized areas using laser burns. Both the xenon arc and argon laser can be used however, the argon laser carries a reduced risk of complications. In comparison, scatter laser coagulation has an indirect effect. Ischemic retina produces vascular endothelial growth factor (VEGF) which promotes neovascularization. Scatter laser coagulation destroys this ischemic retina using laser burns thus preventing vitreous hemorrhage, retinal detachment and vision loss.

=== Surgery ===
Surgical intervention is indicated for severely advanced disease that poses a threat to visual acuity. Indications include longstanding vitreous haemorrhage, vitreous haemorrhage in both eyes, vitreous haemorrhage in patients with only one eye, epiretinal membranes, macular holes and the various forms of retinal detachment. Scleral buckle was a previously popular surgical intervention however, its complications include anterior segment ischemia as a result of vascular occlusion. The vascular occlusion can in turn lead to phthisis bulbi. Pars plans vitrectomy is useful for the management of vitreous haemorrhage. Its complications include cataracts, hyphema, glaucoma and unresolved vitreous haemorrhage.
