= Toxic and nutritional optic neuropathy =

- Specialty: Ophthalmology

Toxic and nutritional optic neuropathy is a group of medical disorders defined by visual impairment due to optic nerve damage secondary to a toxic substance and/or nutritional deficiency. The causes of these disorders are various, but they are linked by shared signs and symptoms. In several of these disorders, both toxic and nutritional factors play a role, acting synergistically.

== Signs and symptoms ==
Vision loss in toxic and nutritional optic neuropathy is bilateral, symmetric, painless, gradual, and progressive. Dyschromatopsia, a change in color vision, is often the first symptom. Some patients notice that certain colors, particularly red, are less bright or vivid; others have a general loss of color perception. Loss of visual acuity may start with a blur or haze at the point of fixation, followed by a progressive decline. The degree of vision loss can extend to total blindness, but a loss beyond 20/400 is rare, except in the case of methanol ingestion. Peripheral vision is usually spared since the pattern of loss typically involves a central or cecocentral scotoma, a visual field defect at or surrounding the point of fixation. This pattern can be revealed via visual field testing.

Upon examination, the pupils usually demonstrate a normal response to light and near stimulation. In those who are practically blind, the pupils will be dilated with a weak or absent response to light. The optic disc may appear normal, swollen, or hyperemic in early stages. With hyperemia, disc hemorrhages may also be present. Continued damage to the optic nerve results in the development of optic atrophy, classically seen as temporal pallor of the optic disc.

== Cause ==
=== Toxic optic neuropathy ===
There are several causes of toxic optic neuropathy. Among these are: ingestion of methanol (wood alcohol), ethylene glycol (automotive antifreeze), disulfiram (used to treat chronic alcoholism), halogenated hydroquinolones (amebicidal medications), ethambutol and isoniazid (tuberculosis treatment), and antibiotics such as linezolid and chloramphenicol as well as chloroquine and the related hydroxychloroquine (for lupus and rheumatoid arthritis) where it is known as chloroquine retinopathy. Tobacco may also cause a type of toxic optic neuropathy called Tobacco optic neuropathy.

=== Nutritional optic neuropathy ===
The predominant cause of nutritional optic neuropathy is thought to be deficiency of B-complex vitamins, particularly thiamine (vitamin B_{1}), cyanocobalamin (vitamin B_{12}) and recently copper. Deficiency of pyridoxine (vitamin B_{6}), niacin (vitamin B_{3}), riboflavin (vitamin B_{2}), and/or folic acid also seems to play a role. Those individuals who consume excessive amounts of alcohol and use tobacco are at greater risk because they tend to be malnourished. Those with pernicious anemia are also at risk due to an impaired ability to absorb vitamin B_{12} from the intestinal tract.

== Pathophysiology ==
All of the above risk factors impact mitochondrial oxidative phosphorylation. Thus, the toxic and nutritional optic neuropathies are actually acquired mitochondrial optic neuropathies. The clinical picture that they produce is akin to that of the congenital mitochondrial optic neuropathies, e.g., Leber's hereditary optic neuropathy and Kjer's optic neuropathy.

== Diagnosis ==
The diagnosis of toxic or nutritional optic neuropathy is usually established by a detailed medical history and careful eye examination. If the medical history clearly points to a cause, neuroimaging to rule out a compressive or infiltrative lesion is optional. However, if the medical history is atypical or does not clearly point to a cause, neuroimaging is required to rule out other causes and confirm the diagnosis. In most cases of suspected toxic or nutritional optic neuropathy that require neuroimaging, an MRI scan is obtained. Further testing, guided by the medical history and physical examination, can be performed to elucidate a specific toxin or nutritional deficiency as a cause of the optic neuropathy. Examples include blood testing for methanol levels or vitamin B_{12} levels.

== Treatment ==
Treatment of toxic and nutritional optic neuropathy is dictated by the cause of the disorder.

- Toxic optic neuropathy is treated by identification and removal of the offending agent. Depending upon the individual affected, the nature of the agent, total exposure prior to removal, and degree of vision loss at the time of diagnosis, the prognosis is variable.
- Nutritional optic neuropathy is treated with improved nutrition. A well-balanced diet with plenty of protein and green leafy vegetables, vitamin supplementation (thiamine, vitamin B_{12}, folic acid, multivitamins), and reduction of smoking and/or drinking are the mainstay of treatment. Again, prognosis is variable and dependent upon the affected individual, treatment compliance, and degree of vision loss at diagnosis.

In both toxic and nutritional neuropathy, vision generally recovers to normal over several days to weeks, though it may take months for full restoration and there is always the risk of permanent vision loss. Visual acuity usually recovers before color vision.

== Epidemiology ==
In industrialized nations, toxic and nutritional optic neuropathy is relatively uncommon and is primarily associated with specific medications, occupational exposures, or tobacco and alcohol use disorder. However, in developing nations, nutritional optic neuropathy is much more common, especially in regions afflicted by shortage. All genders and all races are equally affected, and all ages are susceptible.
