= Hyphema =

Hemorrhage in the front chamber of the eye

- Other names: Hyphaema
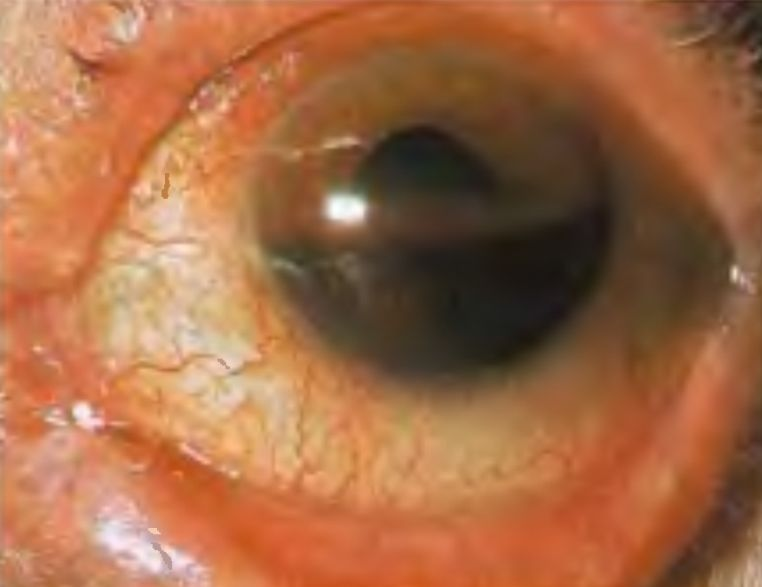
- Hyphema - occupying half of anterior chamber of eye
- Specialty: Ophthalmology

Hyphema is the medical condition of bleeding in the anterior chamber of the eye between the iris and the cornea. People usually first notice a loss or decrease in vision. The eye may also appear to have a reddish tinge, or it may appear as a small pool of blood at the bottom of the iris in the cornea. A traumatic hyphema is caused by a blow to the eye. A hyphema can also occur spontaneously.

== Presentation ==
A decrease in vision or a loss of vision is often the first sign of a hyphema. People with microhyphema may have slightly blurred or normal vision. A person with a full hyphema may not be able to see at all (complete loss of vision). The person's vision may improve over time as the blood moves by gravity lower in the anterior chamber of the eye, between the iris and the cornea. In many people, the vision will improve, however some people may have other injuries related to trauma to the eye or complications related to the hyphema. A microhyphema, where red blood cells are hanging in the anterior chamber of the eye, is less severe. A layered hyphema when fresh blood is seen lower in the anterior chamber is moderately severe. A full hyphema (total hyphema), when blood fills up the chamber completely, is the most severe.

=== Complications ===
While the vast majority of hyphemas resolve on their own without issue, sometimes complications occur. Traumatic hyphema may lead to increased intraocular pressure (IOP), peripheral anterior synechiae, atrophy of the optic nerve, staining of the cornea with blood, re-bleeding, and impaired accommodation.

Secondary hemorrhage, or rebleeding of the hyphema, is thought to worsen outcomes in terms of visual function and lead to complications such as glaucoma, corneal staining, optic atrophy, or vision loss. Rebleeding occurs in 4–35% of hyphema cases and is a risk factor for glaucoma. Young children with traumatic hyphema are at an increased risk of developing amblyopia, an irreversible condition.

== Causes ==
The eye is divided into a small front (anterior) segment, in front of the lens, and a large rear (posterior) segment, behind the lens. The anterior chamber is the light gray area at the top of this illustration.

Hyphemas are frequently caused by injury, and may partially or completely block vision. The most common causes of hyphema are intraocular surgery, blunt trauma, and lacerating trauma. Hyphemas may also occur spontaneously, without any inciting trauma. Spontaneous hyphemas are usually caused by the abnormal growth of blood vessels (neovascularization), tumors of the eye (retinoblastoma or iris melanoma), uveitis, or vascular anomalies (juvenile xanthogranuloma). Additional causes of spontaneous hyphema include: rubeosis iridis, myotonic dystrophy, leukemia, hemophilia, and von Willebrand disease. Conditions or medications that cause thinning of the blood, such as aspirin, warfarin, or drinking alcohol may also cause hyphema. Source of bleeding in hyphema with blunt trauma to eye is circulus iridis major artery.

== Treatment ==
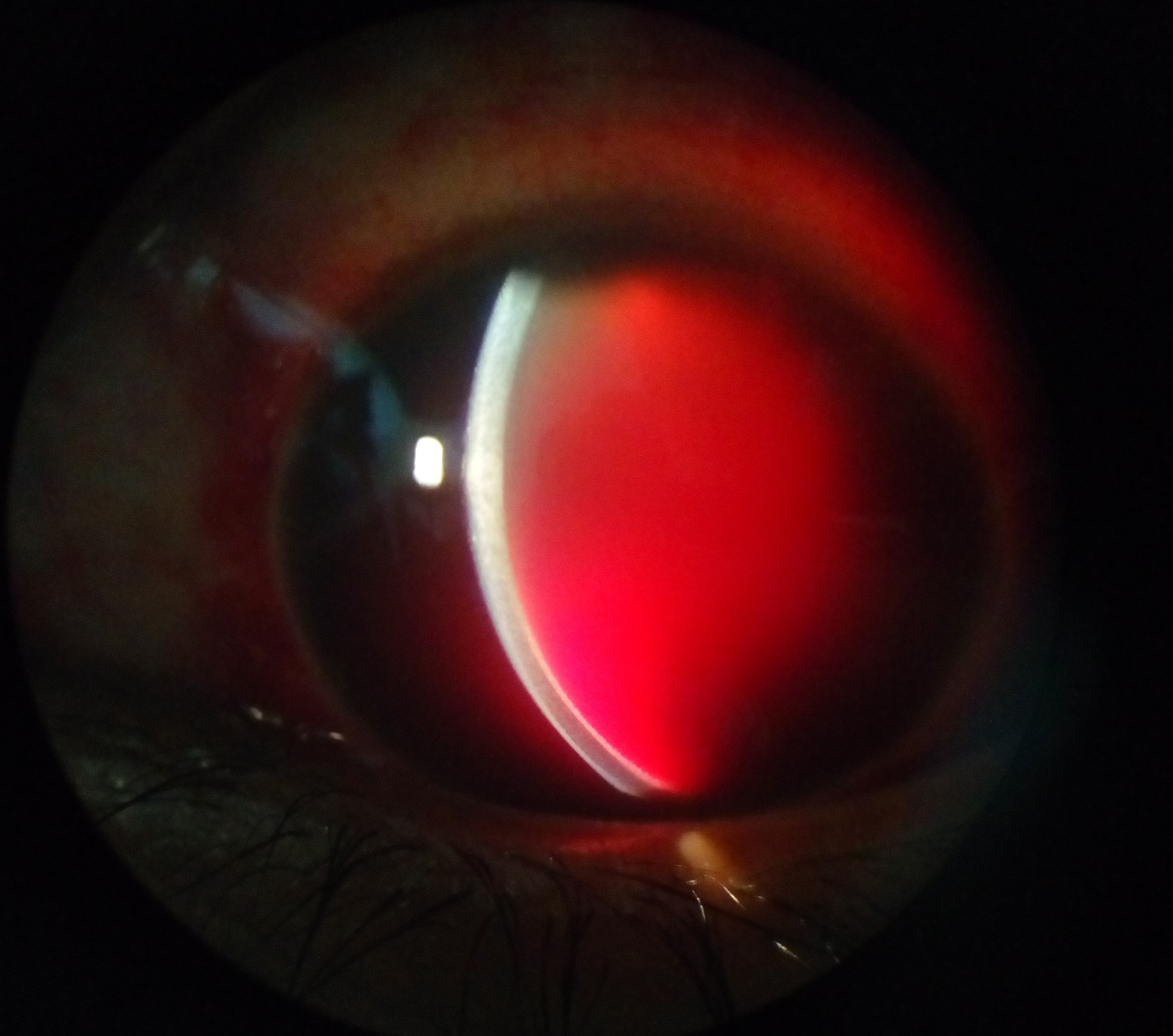
Total hyphema

The main goals of treatment are to decrease the risk of re-bleeding within the eye, corneal blood staining, and atrophy of the optic nerve. Small hyphemas can usually be treated on an outpatient basis. There is little evidence that most of the commonly used treatments for hyphema (antifibrinolytic agents [oral and systemic aminocaproic acid, tranexamic acid, and aminomethylbenzoic acid], corticosteroids [systemic and topical], cycloplegics, miotics, aspirin, conjugated estrogens, traditional Chinese medicine, monocular versus bilateral patching, elevation of the head, and bed rest) are effective at improving visual acuity after two weeks. Surgery may be necessary for non-resolving hyphemas, or hyphemas that are associated with high pressure that does not respond to medication. Surgery can be effective for cleaning out the anterior chamber and preventing corneal blood staining.

If pain management is necessary, acetaminophen can be used. Aspirin and ibuprofen should be avoided, because they interfere with platelets' ability to form a clot and consequently increase the risk of additional bleeding. Sedation is not usually necessary for patients with hyphema.

Aminocaproic or tranexamic acids are often prescribed for hyphema on the basis that they reduce the risk of rebleeding by inhibiting the conversion of plasminogen to plasmin, and thereby keeping clots stable. However, the evidence for their effectiveness is limited and aminocaproic acid may actually cause hyphemas to take longer to clear.

== Prognosis ==
Hyphemas require urgent assessment by an optometrist or ophthalmologist as they may result in permanent visual impairment.

A long-standing hyphema may result in hemosiderosis and heterochromia. Blood accumulation may also cause an elevation of the intraocular pressure. On average, the increased pressure in the eye remains for six days before dropping. Most uncomplicated hyphemas resolve within 5–6 days.

== Epidemiology ==
As of 2012, the rate of hyphemas in the United States are about 20 cases per 100,000 people annually. The majority of people with a traumatic hyphema are children and young adults. 60% of traumatic hyphemas are sports-related, and there are more cases in males compared to females.

== See also ==
- Hypopyon – Medical condition with inflammatory cells inside the front of the eye
- Uveitis–glaucoma–hyphema syndrome – Complication of cataract surgery
