= Ocular Manifestations of Non-Communicable Diseases in Nigeria =

Ocular manifestation

Non-communicable disease are responsible for significant morbidity, mortality and disability in Nigeria, and are marked top diseases for intervention. The prevalent Non-Communicable Diseases(NCD's) include the following: cardiovascular disease(hypertension, rheumatic heart disease, stroke), cancers, diabetes mellitus, sickle cell disease, bronchial asthma.

== Ocular manifestaion of diabetes mellitus (diabetic retinopathy) in Nigeria ==
The global burden of diabetes is expected to rise substantially, with the number of adults aged 20–79 years living with the disease projected to increase from 382 million in 2013 to 592 million by 2035. Although India and other Asian countries are anticipated to record the highest absolute numbers of diabetes cases by 2035, the most rapid growth is expected in the Middle Eastern Crescent (+96%) and Sub-Saharan Africa (+109%). In Sub-Saharan Africa specifically, the number of people living with diabetes is projected to more than double, increasing from 19.8 million in 2013 to 41.4 million in 2035. Despite these alarming projections, public health policies and strategies to address the growing diabetes epidemic in the region remain inadequate or are entirely lacking.

Diabetic retinopathy (DR) is a major cause of visual impairment worldwide, accounting for approximately 5% of all blindness and affecting about 2 million people globally. It is the leading cause of blindness among individuals aged 15–64 years in industrialized countries. DR is broadly classified into Non-Proliferative Diabetic Retinopathy (NPDR) and Proliferative Diabetic Retinopathy (PDR), with PDR and diabetic macular edema (DME) representing the sight-threatening forms that can lead to severe visual impairment or blindness. Key risk factors include long-standing diabetes, poor glycaemic control, and hypertension. However, evidence from clinical trials indicates that early detection and treatment of PDR and DME can preserve vision. Consequently, vision loss due to DR is largely preventable, with estimates suggesting that up to 90% of DR-related blindness could be avoided through standardized diabetic care and adherence to established treatment protocols

In Nigeria, a national survey conducted in 2014 reported a diabetes prevalence of 3.25% (95% CI: 2.5–4.3%) with 10% of 40 year old individuals with DR have in increased complications. Subsequent studies revealed considerable regional variation, with prevalence estimates ranging from 1.6% to 12.7% in the same age group [7–12]. In an urban population in southern Nigeria, the prevalence was reported at 6.8% (95% CI: 4.6–9.0%) among adults aged 40 years and above.

In a cross-sectional research conducted during the Nigerian National Blindeness and Visual Impairment Survey, it was concluded that about 10% of Nigerians aged 40 years and above with diabetes may have sight-threatening diabetic retinopathy, underscoring the urgent need for improved diabetes screening, early diagnosis, and integrated eye-care services.

== Hypertensive retinopathy in Nigeria ==
Hypertension (HTN) is one of the most important modifiable risk factors for cardiovascular disease (CVD) globally. The burden of the disease is particularly high in low- and middle-income countries (LMICs), including Nigeria, where the prevalence of hypertension continues to rise amid low levels of awareness, inadequate treatment and poor blood pressure control compared with high-income countries. Alarmingly, it is estimated that nearly 46% of adults living with hypertension are unaware of their condition. If left undiagnosed or poorly controlled, hypertension can damage blood vessels and vital organs throughout the body, leading to serious complications such as heart attack, stroke, heart failure, kidney disease, vision loss, sexual dysfunction and atherosclerosis. In Nigeria, hypertension is the most commonly diagnosed cardiovascular risk factor, and its complications account for about 25% of emergency admissions in urban hospitals. A report shows that one out four Nigerian is hypertensive,which makes hypertension a major contributor to Cardiovascular disease (CVD) related death in the country due to unawareness.

A hospital-based descriptive cross-sectional survey, whose aim was to determine the level of awareness and prevalence of hypertensive retinopathy amongst 381 hypertensive patients(aged 40 and above) across 21 healthcare facilities in a southeastern state of Nigeria shows 83.2% prevalence, 20.7% were aware while 79.3% were unaware of hypertensive retinopathy.

== See also ==
- Ocular manifestations of non-communicable diseases in Rwanda
