= GCG =

GCG may refer to:

== Biochemistry ==
- GCG, a codon for the amino acid alanine
- Gallocatechin gallate, a flavonol
- Glucagon, a peptide hormone
  - Proglucagon, its precursor protein

== Medical ==
- Ghost cell glaucoma

== Other uses ==
- Gallantry Cross, Gold of the Republic of Venda
- Geological Curators' Group, a UK charity promoting geology
- Global Church of God, a Sabbatarian church based in England
- Government College Gujranwala, in Pakistan
- The Grilled Cheese Grill, an American restaurant chain
- Guardian Capital Group, a Canadian financial services company
- Gwaun-Cae-Gurwen, a village in Neath Port Talbot, Wales
- Knight Grand Cross of the Royal Guelphic Order, a Hanoverian order of chivalry
