= Mitochondrial optic neuropathies =

Group of visual disorders

Mitochondrial optic neuropathies are a heterogenous group of disorders that present with visual disturbances resultant from mitochondrial dysfunction within the anatomy of the Retinal Ganglion Cells (RGC), optic nerve, optic chiasm, and optic tract. These disturbances are multifactorial, their aetiology consisting of metabolic and/or structural damage as a consequence of genetic mutations, environmental stressors, or both. The three most common neuro-ophthalmic abnormalities seen in mitochondrial disorders are bilateral optic neuropathy, ophthalmoplegia with ptosis, and pigmentary retinopathy.

== Signs and symptoms ==
The generalized, common presentation for this broad and inclusive group of diseases is painless, bilateral loss of visual acuity and pallor of the optic disc accompanied with varying degrees of dyschromatopsia and central/cecocentral scatomas. On examination the pupillary responses may be sluggish to light. One would not expect to find an afferent pupillary defect because optic neuropathies are often bilateral and symmetric. The optic disc may appear mildly hyperemic with small splinter hemorrhages on or around the disc, or may appear nearly normal. Optic atrophy typically develops later and may appear mild. In later stages the optic atrophy can become severe, which indicates less opportunity for recovery.

The duration of onset can vary between immediate and insidious, owing to the specific etiology. Two key features may be helpful in distinguishing acquired from inherited optic neuropathies: absence of a family history and simultaneous involvement of both eyes; the former more commonly characterized by these two features.

== Causes ==
Because this grouping of diseases is of heterogenic origin, the causes can be singular or additive consequences of genetic, toxic, or nutritional stress.

Mitochondria are maternally inherited, so a genetic defect in mitochondrial DNA (mtDNA) is passed on from mother to child. Mitochondria, however, depend on other proteins that are encoded by nuclear genes, constructed in the cytoplasm and then transported into the mitochondria. So it follows that, while an mtDNA point mutation are inherited through the mother, defects in nuclear DNA, even those affecting the mitochondria, will be transmitted in Mendelian fashion.

Optic neuropathies that are acquired can be the result of several processes. These include prolonged use of certain antibiotics or anti-tuberculosis medications, exposure to certain toxic chemicals, and situations that contribute to poor consumption or decreased absorption of nutrient-dense foods.

A possible synergism between genetic and acquired mitochondrial optic neuropathies has been suggested and there are only a few case reports to support this phenomenon, requiring further research and demonstration of evidence to corroborate these findings

=== Nutritional optic neuropathies ===
Nutritional deficiency may be the cause of a genuine optic neuropathy, sometimes associated with involvement of the peripheral nervous system, called peripheral neuropathy. Loss of vision is usually bilateral, painless, chronic, insidious and slowly progressive. Most often, they present as a non-specific retrobulbar optic neuropathy. Patients may notice that colors are not as vivid or bright as before and that the color red is washed out. This normally occurs in both eyes at the same time and is not associated with any eye pain. They might initially notice a blur or fog, followed by a drop in vision. While vision loss may be rapid, progression to blindness is unusual. These patients tend to have blind spots in the center of their vision with preserved peripheral vision. In most cases, the pupils continue to respond normally to light.

Again, the pathophysiological mechanisms involved in nutritional optic neuropathies is common to all mitochondrial optic neuropathies: it affects biochemical pathways involved in cell energetic production, correction of oxidative stress and quenching of free radicals. Specific deficiencies of cyanocobalamin, thiamine, riboflavin, niacin, and pyridoxine, folic acid, and other proteins with sulfur-containing amino acids may play a role.

Months of depletion are usually necessary to deplete body stores of most nutrients and a nutritional optic neuropathy may be present in a patient with or without obvious evidence of under-nutrition. An individual suffering from starvation could be easily recognized as a person who is undernourished due to their cachectic corporal appearance. However, a not so obvious individual may be the recipient of a gastric bypass surgery, a procedure that may lead to vitamin B12 deficiency from poor absorption. The optic neuropathy associated with pernicious anemia and vitamin B12 deficiency can be seen amongst individuals who obtain adequate caloric input from foods low in nutritional and micronutrient density (see Food desert).

Additionally, nutrient-poor diet may also be low in anti-oxidants, substances critical to preventing the damaging effects of reactive oxygen species (ROS). ROS are a natural bi-product of the mitochondrial production of ATP. As such, if they are allowed to accumulate without being neutralized, they could damage the very mitochondria from which they are being produced.

There is documentation of nutritional optic neuropathy among undernourished Allied prisoners of war of the Japanese during World War II. After four months of food deprivation, some of the prisoners developed sub-acute vision loss in both eyes in addition to experiencing pain in their extremities and hearing loss. Their visual loss did not correlate well with malnutrition and that not all prisoners experienced the loss of vision.

=== Toxic optic neuropathies (TON) ===
Toxic optic neuropathy refers to the ingestion of a toxin or an adverse drug reaction that results in vision loss from optic nerve damage. Patients may report either a sudden loss of vision in both eyes, in the setting of an acute intoxication, or an insidious asymmetric loss of vision from an adverse drug reaction. The most important aspect of treatment is recognition and drug withdrawal.

Among the many causes of TON, the top 10 toxins include:

- Medications
  - Ethambutol, rifampin, isoniazid, streptomycin (tuberculosis treatment)
  - Linezolid (taken for bacterial infections, including pneumonia)
  - Chloramphenicol (taken for serious infections not helped by other antibiotics)
  - Isoretinoin (taken for severe acne that fails to respond to other treatments)
  - Ciclosporin (widely used immunosuppressant)
- Acute Toxins
  - Methanol (component of some moonshine, and some cleaning products)
  - Ethylene glycol (present in anti-freeze and hydraulic brake fluid)

Metabolic disorders may also cause this version of disease. Systemic problems such as diabetes mellitus, kidney failure, and thyroid disease can cause optic neuropathy, which is likely through buildup of toxic substances within the body. In most cases, the cause of the toxic neuropathy impairs the tissue's vascular supply or metabolism. It remains unknown as to why certain agents are toxic to the optic nerve while others are not and why particularly the papillomacular bundle gets affected.

=== Combined Mitochondrial Optic Neuropathies ===
==== Tobacco Alcohol Ambylopia (TAA) ====
TAA is an old term for a constellation of elements that can lead to a mitochondrial optic neuropathy. The classic patient is a man with a history of heavy alcohol and tobacco consumption. Respectively, this combines nutritional mitochondrial impairment, from vitamin deficiencies (folate and B-12) classically seen in alcoholics, with tobacco-derived products, such as cyanide and ROS. It has been suggested that the additive effect of the cyanide toxicity, ROS, and deficiencies of thiamine, riboflavin, pyridoxine, and b12 result in TAA.

==== Cuban Epidemic of Optic Neuropathy ====
Between 1992 and 1993, in the Cuban Epidemic of Optic Neuropathy, nearly 50,000 people in Cuba were affected with optic neuropathy, sensory and autonomic peripheral neuropathy, neural deafness, and in a few cases, myelopathy. The most common pattern of symptoms consisted of severe weight loss, fatigue and a subacute loss of vision. On the fundus, an objective sign was noted: a wedge defect of the temporal optic disc and the loss of the corresponding Papillomacular bundle. Most of the patients reported high consumption of alcohol particularly homemade rum and smoking cigarettes. This was associated with severe deficiencies of protein and vitamin intake, in particular of vitamin B12 and folate. This picture of vitamin deficiencies was exacerbated by low levels of methanol present in homemade rum. It was thought that the Cuban epidemic may have been caused by the chronic accumulation of formate from methanol metabolism in a population with severe folic acid depletion and the accumulation of cyanide from cigarette smoke. This conclusion was supported by evidence of improvement in visual acuity on prompt and daily administration of cyanocobalamin (3 mg) and folate (250 mg) along with dietary supplementation.

=== Hereditary Optic Neuropathies ===
The inherited optic neuropathies typically manifest as symmetric bilateral central visual loss. Optic nerve damage in most inherited optic neuropathies is permanent and progressive.

==== Leber's Hereditary Optic Neuropathy (LHON) ====
LHON, as the name suggests, is an inherited mutation that results in acute or subacute vision loss, displays incomplete penetrance and predominantly affects young males. Onset is usually between the 2nd and 4th decade of life, and usually presents with rapid vision loss in one eye followed by involvement of the second eye (usually within months). Visual acuity often remains stable and poor (below 20/200) with a residual central visual field defect. Patients with the m.14484/ND6 mutation are most likely to have visual recovery.

==== Autosomal Dominant Optic Atrophy (DOA) ====
DOA is an autosomal dominant disease caused by a defect in the nuclear gene OPA1. A slowly progressive optic neuropathy, usually presents in the first decade of life and is bilaterally symmetrical. Examination of these patients shows loss of visual acuity, temporal pallor of the optic discs, centrocecal scotomas with peripheral sparing, and subtle impairments in color vision.

==== Behr's syndrome ====
This is a rare autosomal recessive disorder characterized by early-onset optic atrophy, ataxia, and spasticity.

==== Charcot Marie Tooth disease (CMT) ====
This disease is a heterogenous group of inherited neuropathies, stemming from a MFN2 mutation, in which both motor and sensory nerves are affected, resulting in distal limb weakness, sensory loss, decreased deep tendon reflexes, and foot deformities. Affected individuals develop progressive optic nerve dysfunction starting later in childhood.

==== Hereditary spastic paraplegia (HSP) ====
HSP is marked by slowly progressive lower limb spasticity and weakness. HSP can be classified into pure and complicated forms, depending on whether additional clinical features are present besides spastic paraplegia, such as optic atrophy, ataxia, peripheral neuropathy, extrapyramidal deficits, and cognitive decline.

==== Friedreich's ataxia (FA) ====
FA is an autosomal recessive disorder caused by pathological GAA trinucleotide repeat expansions in the FXN gene. The encoded protein frataxin is directed to the mitochondrial inner membrane and is involved in the assembly of iron-sulphur cluster, which are a critical component of the mitochondrial respiratory chain complexes.

In a recent study of 26 patients with confirmed FA, all patients had evidence of optic nerve dysfunction, although only five were visually symptomatic. The optic neuropathy differed from that of LHON or DOA, displaying a pattern of retinal nerve fiber layer (RNFL) loss and no preferential involvement of papillomacular bundle.

==== Mitochondrial encephalomyopathies ====
Includes Mitochondrial Encephalitis Lactic Acidosis Seizures (MELAS), myoclonic epilepsy and ragged red fibers (MERRF), maternally inherited Leigh syndrome (MILS), and mitochondrial neurograstrointestinal encephalomyopathy (MNGIE), all of which can all develop optic neuropathies, although it is usually a secondary feature overshadowed by more prominent neurological features.

==== Overlapping phenotypes ====
As our understanding of mitochondrial diseases improves a degree of similarity and overlap are seen within this group of disorders. For example, in some OPA1 carriers, patients will develop neurological features indistinguishable from HSP while others develop a pattern of peripheral neuropathy with a similar disease course to CMT, and still others will develop a prominent cerebellar syndrome consistent with FRDA.

== Pathophysiology ==
Even though dysfunction of the mitochondria can be either congenital or acquired, both causes share a common pathophysiology: an impairment of oxidative phosphorylation within the mitochondria, which leads to a decrease of ATP production and a simultaneous increase in ROS.

These mitochondria are made within the central somata of the retinal ganglion cell, transported down axons, and distributed where they are needed. Efficient transportation of mitochondria depends on multiple factors, including their own energy production, the integrity of the cytoskeleton and its protein components (tubulin, etc.), and adequate myelination of the axons. Any dysfunction of these systems may be of pathological relevance for optic neuropathies with primary or secondary involvement of mitochondria. Genetic mutations, toxic insult, and nutritional depletion can all have a negative impact on the structure and function of mitochondria within the optic system, resulting in this type of neuropathy.

== Diagnosis ==
A thorough history is essential and should cover family history, diet; drug/toxin exposure social history, including tobacco and alcohol use; and occupational background, with details on whether similar cases exist among coworkers. Treatment of any chronic disease such as pernicious anemia should always be elucidated.

In most cases of nutritional/toxic optic neuropathy, the diagnosis may be obtained via detailed medical history and eye examination. Additionally, supplementary neurological imaging studies, such as MRI or enhanced CT, may be performed if the cause remains unclear.

When the details of the examination and history indicate a familial history of similar ocular or systemic disease, whether or not there is evidence of toxic or nutritional causes for disease, certain genetic tests may be required. Because there are several congenital causes of mitochondrial dysfunction, the patients history, examination, and radiological studies must be examined in order to determine the specific genetic tests required. For example, 90% of cases of Leber's Hereditary Optic Neuropathy (LHON) are associated with three common mtDNA point mutations (m.3460G>A/MT-ND1, m.11778G>A/MT-ND4, m.14484T>C/MT-ND6) while a wider range of mtDNA mutations (MT-ND1, MT-ND5, MT-ND6; WebHome < MITOMAP < Foswiki) have been associated with overlapping phenotypes of LHON, MELAS, and Leigh syndrome.

== Treatment ==
Treatment is dependent upon diagnosis and the stage at which the diagnosis is secured. For toxic and nutritional optic neuropathies, the most important course is to remove the offending agent if possible and to replace the missing nutritional elements, orally, intramuscularly, or intravenously. If treatment is delayed, the injury may be irreversible. The course of treatment varies with the congenital forms of these neuropathies. There are some drug treatments that have shown modest success, such as Idebenone used to treat LOHN. Often treatment is relegated to lifestyle alterations and accommodations and supportive measures.

== Epidemiology ==
Those diseases understood as congenital in origin could either be specific to the ocular organ system (LHON, DOA) or syndromic (MELAS, multiple sclerosis). It is estimated that these inherited optic neuropathies in the aggregate affect 1 in 10,000

Of the acquired category, disease falls into further etiological distinction as arising from toxic (drugs or chemicals) or nutritional/metabolic (vitamin deficiency/diabetes) insult. It is worth mentioning that under-nutrition and toxic insult can occur simultaneously, so a third category may be understood as having a combined or mixed etiology. We will refer to this as Toxic/Nutritional Optic Neuropathy, whereby nutritional deficiencies and toxic/metabolic insults are the simultaneous culprits of visual loss associated with damage and disruption of the RGC and optic nerve mitochondria.
