= Rubeosis iridis =

- Other names: Neovascularization of the iris
- Specialty: Ophthalmology

Rubeosis iridis is a medical condition of the iris of the eye in which new abnormal blood vessels (formed by neovascularization) are found on the surface of the iris.

== Causes ==
This condition is often associated with diabetes in advanced proliferative diabetic retinopathy. Other conditions causing rubeosis iridis include central retinal vein occlusion, ocular ischemic syndrome, and chronic retinal detachment.

== Pathophysiology ==
It is usually associated with disease processes in the retina, which involve the retina becoming starved of oxygen (ischaemic). The ischemic retina releases a variety of factors, the most important of which is vascular endothelial growth factor (VEGF). These factors stimulate the formation of new blood vessels (angiogenesis). These new vessels do not have the same characteristics as the blood vessels originally formed in the eye. In addition, new blood vessels can form in areas that do not have them. Specifically, new blood vessels can be observed on the iris. In addition to the blood vessels in the iris, they can grow into the angle of the eye. These blood vessels eventually go through a process called fibrosis which closes the normal physiologic anatomy of the angle. The closing of the angle prevents fluid from leaving the eye resulting in an increase in intraocular pressure. This is called neovascular glaucoma.

== Treatment ==
If caught early, the neovascularization can be reversed with prompt panretinal photocoagulation (PRP), or injection of anti-VEGF medications with subsequent PRP. The injection blocks the direct effect of VEGF and acts more quickly but will wear off in about six weeks. PRP has a slower onset of action but can last permanently. Once the neovascularization has been longstanding, the new vessels recruit fibrous tissue, and as this forms and contracts, the angle can be permanently damaged, and will not respond to treatment. If this occurs, then surgical intervention is required to reduce the pressure (such as a glaucoma drainage implant)

== See also ==
- CNV (choroidal neovascularization)
- CNV (corneal neovascularization)
- NVD (neovascularization of the disc)
