= Uveitis–glaucoma–hyphema syndrome =

Complication of cataract surgery

Uveitis–glaucoma–hyphaema (UGH) syndrome, also known as Ellingson syndrome, is a complication of cataract surgery, caused by intraocular lens subluxation or dislocation. The chafing of mispositioned intraocular lens over iris, ciliary body or iridocorneal angle cause elevated intraocular pressure (IOP) anterior uveitis and hyphema. It is most commonly caused by anterior chamber IOLs and sulcus IOLs but, the condition can be seen with any type of IOL, including posterior chamber lenses and cosmetic iris implants.

== Signs and symptoms ==
Uveitis, Glaucoma, and Hyphema are the classic sins of UGH syndrome, but the term is often used when one, two, or all three signs are present in the presence of any IOL causing mechanical irritation of the iris or angle structures. Blurred vision, transient vision loss, eye pain, photophobia, erythropsia (objects appear red) are the main symptoms.

== Variations ==
UGH Plus and IPUGH (Incomplete Posterior UGH) are the variations of UGH syndrome. IPUGH is defined as bleeding into the posterior chamber with/ without glaucoma and no uveitis. UGH Plus is defined as a UGH syndrome plus a vitreous hemorrhage and occurs more frequently with anterior chamber IOLs but can occur with any IOLs.

== Pathophysiology ==
The mechanical irritation of mispositioned intraocular lens over iris, ciliary body or iridocorneal angle cause spectrum of iris transillumination defects including anterior uveitis, hyphema and elevated intraocular pressure (IOP). Uveitis results from mechanical breakdown of the blood–aqueous barrier and resultant intraocular inflammation. A hyphema results from damage to vascular tissue of the iris, ciliary body, or angle by mispositioned IOL. Elevated intraocular pressure can be caused by pigment dispersion, uveitis, hyphema or direct blocking of aqueous humor drainage system.UGH syndrome is most commonly caused by anterior chamber IOLs and sulcus IOLs, but it can be seen with any type of IOL, including posterior chamber lenses and cosmetic iris implants. The condition has significantly reduced due to increased use of posterior chamber IOLs, advancements in lens design, IOL material and surgical techniques. Currently, majority of IOLs are implanted in the capsular bag, minimizing the chance of IOL contacting uveal structures.

== Diagnosis ==
The diagnosis of UGH Syndrome is mainly based on patient history and eye examination. Patient will have history of cataract surgery with intraocular lens implantation. Slit-lamp examination may reveal hyphaema, aqueous cells and flare, iris neovascularization, mispositioned IOL, iris-lens contact, iris transillumination defects etc.

== Treatment ==
Initially, topical and systemic medication to control inflammation and raised IOP is appropriate, but the definitive treatment is an IOL reposition or exchange. Topical corticosteroids may be used to control anterior inflammation. Raised IOP can be lowered using topical and systemic anti-glaucoma medications such as prostaglandin analogs, beta-adrenergic antagonists, alpha-adrenergic agonists, and carbonic anhydrase inhibitors etc.

== History ==
The UGH Syndrome was originally described by Ellingson in 1978 and classically included uveitis, glaucoma, and hyphaema in the setting of an anterior chamber IOL.
