= Ghost cell glaucoma =

- Specialty: Ophthalmology
- Symptoms: Blurring of vision, eye pain, nausea and vomiting
- Complications: Optic nerve damage, permanent vision loss
- Causes: Vitreous hemorrhage
- Risk factors: Increased pressure in the eye
- Diagnostic method: eye examination, gonioscopy
- Treatment: Medication, surgery

Ghost cell glaucoma (GCG) is a type of secondary glaucoma occurs due to long standing vitreous hemorrhage. The rigid and less pliable degenerated red blood cells (ghost cells) block the trabecular meshwork and increase the pressure inside eyes.

== Pathophysiology ==
The ghost cells develop within the vitreous cavity, 1–3 weeks after vitreous hemorrhage. They obstruct the trabecular meshwork and eventually the pressure inside eye (intraocular pressure) increases and leads to glaucoma. A variety of ocular conditions may cause GCG. Main causes include ocular trauma, diabetes, sickle cell disease, uveitis, UGH syndrome, many eye surgeries etc.

== Signs and symptoms ==
Myriad small cells may be seen in the aqueous humor during slit lamp examination. Intraocular pressure rises up to 30 to 70 mm Hg. The increased intraocular pressure may cause blurring of vision, headache, brow ache, nausea and/or vomiting. The angle of anterior chamber is seen open with gonioscopy.

== Complications ==
If the increased intraocular pressure is uncontrolled, it may lead to optic nerve damage and irreversible visual impairment.

== Treatment ==
The condition usually resolves once the vitreous hemorrhage has cleared. But, depending on the seriousness of the increased intraocular pressure, medical or surgical treatment may be advised. If IOP is not so high, medical therapy with aqueous suppressants is preferred. Surgery is advised if the intraocular pressure remains in 40- to 50-mm Hg range even after medical therapy. Anterior chamber can be cleaned by making a small paracentesis in the cornea and irrigating the anterior chamber with a saline solution. Repeat evacuation and aspiration are required if myriad cells accumulate again in anterior chamber.

== History ==
Campbell et al. described Ghost cell glaucoma in 1976. Campbell and Grant described the condition and given the name ghost cell glaucoma. Fenton and Zimmerman called it hemolytic glaucoma.
