= Cherry-red spot =

Eye condition

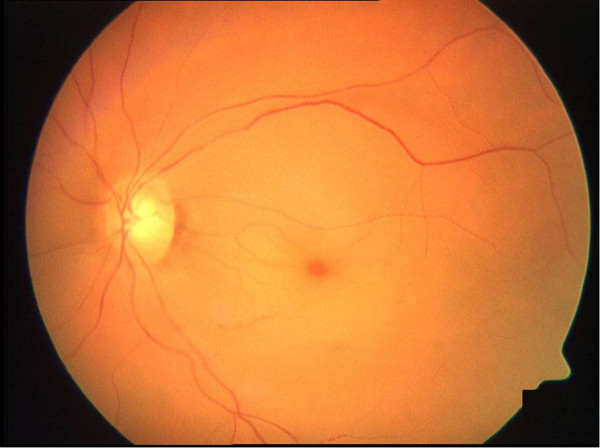
- Typical central retinal artery occlusion with cherry-red spot, retinal oedema and narrowing of the vessels.

A cherry-red spot is a finding in the macula of the eye in a variety of lipid storage disorders and in central retinal artery occlusion. It describes the appearance of a small circular choroid shape as seen through the fovea centralis. Its appearance is due to a relative transparency of the macula; storage disorders cause the accumulation of storage material within the cell layers of the retina, however, the macula, which is relatively devoid of cellular layers, does not build up this material, and thus allows the eye to see through the macula to the red choroid below.

The sign was first described by Warren Tay, founding member of the British Ophthalmological Society, in 1881, with reference to a patient with Tay–Sachs disease.

The cherry red spot is seen in central retinal artery occlusion, appearing several hours after the blockage of the retinal artery occurs. The cherry red spot is seen because the macula receives its blood supply from the choroid, supplied by the long and short posterior ciliary arteries, while the surrounding retina is pale due to retinal artery infarction. It is also seen in several other conditions, classically Tay–Sachs disease, but also in Niemann–Pick disease, Sandhoff disease, and mucolipidosis.

== Differential diagnosis ==
Cherry-red spot as seen here in Tay–Sachs disease, caused by the fovea's center appearing bright red because it is surrounded by a whiter than usual area.

1. Metabolic storage diseases:
  1. Tay–Sachs disease
  2. Farber disease
  3. GM1 and GM2 gangliosidoses
  4. Metachromatic leukodystrophy
  5. Niemann–Pick disease
  6. Sandhoff disease
  7. Sialidosis
2. Congenital developmental diseases (e.g., Leber's congenital amaurosis)
3. Hereditary/familial:
  1. Pantothenate kinase-associated neurodegeneration
4. Vascular (e.g., central retinal artery occlusion)
5. Drugs:
  1. Quinine toxicity
  2. Dapsone toxicity
6. Poisoning:
  1. Carbon monoxide
  2. Methanol
7. Blunt ocular trauma

== See also ==
- Lipid storage disease
