= Chloroquine retinopathy =

- Other names: Bull's eye maculopathy
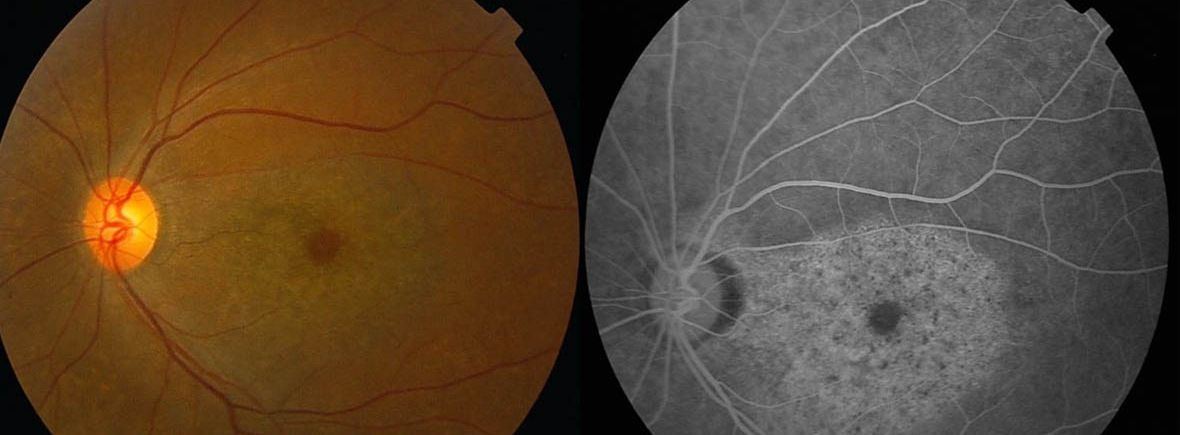
- Chloroquine retinopathy
- Specialty: Ophthalmology

Chloroquine retinopathy is a form of toxic retinopathy (damage of the retina) caused by the drugs chloroquine or hydroxychloroquine, which are sometimes used in the treatment of autoimmune disorders such as rheumatoid arthritis and systemic lupus erythematosus. This eye toxicity limits long-term use of the drugs.

== Presentation ==
The risk of toxicity is low for individuals without complicating conditions during the first five years of treatment using less than 6.5 mg/kg/day of hydroxychloroquine or 3 mg/kg/day of chloroquine, and/or cumulative doses of less than 1000 gram and 460 gram (total dose), respectively. Some physicians suggest that lean body weight is more accurate when calculating daily dosage.

Most patients are routinely given 400 mg of hydroxychloroquine daily (or 250 mg chloroquine). This dose is considered acceptable.

=== Early stage ===
The earliest signs of toxicity include bilateral paracentral visual field changes (best detected with a red test object) and a subtle granular depigmentation of the paracentral RPE.

=== Advanced stage ===
With continued drug exposure, there is progressive development of a bilateral atrophic bull's-eye maculopathy and paracentral scotomata, which may in severe cases ultimately spread over the entire fundus, causing widespread retinal atrophy and visual loss.

== Pathophysiology ==
Both agents bind to melanin pigment in the RPE, and this may serve to concentrate the drugs or to prolong their adverse effects.

== Diagnosis ==
Patients and their primary care physicians must be made fully aware of the ophthalmic risks and the need for regular screening examinations to detect retinal toxicity at an early stage.

Baseline evaluation for patients beginning treatment with a chloroquine derivative should include a complete eye examination by an eye care professional, Optical coherence tomography, retinal photography for follow-up comparisons, and Visual field testing with a white pattern. Central visual field assessment should test the central 10° of vision with a white test target (such as Humphrey 10-2 program).

In patients at risk or those with unclear presentation, optical coherence tomography (loss of IS/OS junctions), fundus autofluorescence (focal hyper or hypoautofluorescence), and multifocal electroretinography (paracentral depressions) may be obtained.

Profound abnormalities detected with visual field and multifocal electroretinography testing can be observed in the presence of a normal retinal appearance. Retinal examinations are advised for documentation, but visible bull's-eye maculopathy is a late change, and the goal of screening is to recognize toxicity at an earlier stage. Annual screening should begin after 5 years (or sooner if there are unusual risk factors).

== Treatment ==
Cessation of the drug at the first sign of toxicity is recommended. No treatment exists as yet for this disorder, so it is imperative that patients and their ophthalmologists be aware of the best practices for minimizing toxic damage.

== Prognosis ==
Associated visual loss rarely recovers and may even progress after the drug is discontinued.
