= Tobacco optic neuropathy =

Optic neuropathy caused by tobacco use

- Specialty: Ophthalmology, Toxicology, Neurology
- Symptoms: Defective vision, defective colour vision, visual field defect
- Complications: Irreversible visual impairment
- Causes: Tobacco use

Tobacco optic neuropathy (TON) is a rare form of toxic optic neuropathy associated with tobacco use, characterized by damage to the optic nerve, progressive visual impairment, visual field defect and defective colour vision. It has historically been reported more frequently among pipe and cigar smokers than cigarette smokers.

== Pathophysiology ==
The pathophysiology of the disease is incompletely understood and also controversial. The exact mechanism by which tobacco causes optic nerve damage is not fully understood. One possibility that has been suggested involves the toxic effects of cyanide released through smoking, combined with an impairment in the body's ability to neutralize it. Another proposed possibility is the deficiency of Vitamin B12. Given that one study found Vitamin B12 deficiency in 26 out of 65 patients with tobacco optic neuropathy, it is believed that nutritional deficiency may also be a contributing factor to the risk of developing the condition.

== Cause ==
Although the condition was historically known as "tobacco-alcohol amblyopia", it is said that tobacco may cause or contribute to toxic optic neuropathy, whereas alcohol is not considered a primary contributing factor and the two are not believed to act together to cause the condition.

Tobacco optic neuropathy is reported mainly in middle-aged and older men, particularly pipe and cigar smokers, but the reasons for its lower occurrence among cigarette smokers are unclear.

== Signs and symptoms ==
Tobacco optic neuropathy is characterized by painless, slowly progressive loss of vision, visual field defect, usually a central or cecocentral scotoma more marked for a red or green target than white and colour vision defect affecting both eyes.

The optic discs that appear normal in early stages becomes pale in colour overtime.

== Diagnosis ==
Diagnosis is based on clinical findings, a history of tobacco use, assessment of nutritional status and exclusion of other causes of optic neuropathy. The history should include the type, duration and extent of tobacco use, as well as alcohol consumption and dietary habits. Biochemical tests may help identify underlying micronutrient deficiencies, particularly vitamin B12 deficiency. Hereditary optic neuropathies, including Leber's hereditary optic neuropathy (LHON), should also be considered in the differential diagnosis.

Visual field tests can be used to detect visual field defects like central or cecocentral scotoma.

== Complications ==
Delayed diagnosis may reduce the chances of complete visual recovery, and residual optic nerve damage may persist in some cases despite treatment.

== Management ==
Management of TON primarily involves complete cessation of tobacco. Quitting smoking may lead to gradual visual improvement over 3–12 months. Usually, visual acuity recovers before color vision. Vitamin supplementation, particularly B-group vitamins and intramuscular hydroxocobalamin (Vitamin B12) is also been used for visual recovery. Counselling and rehabilitation programmes may help maintain abstinence and prevent relapse.
