= Arteriovenous nicking =

Small blood vessel compression and bulging in the retina of the eye

AV nicking
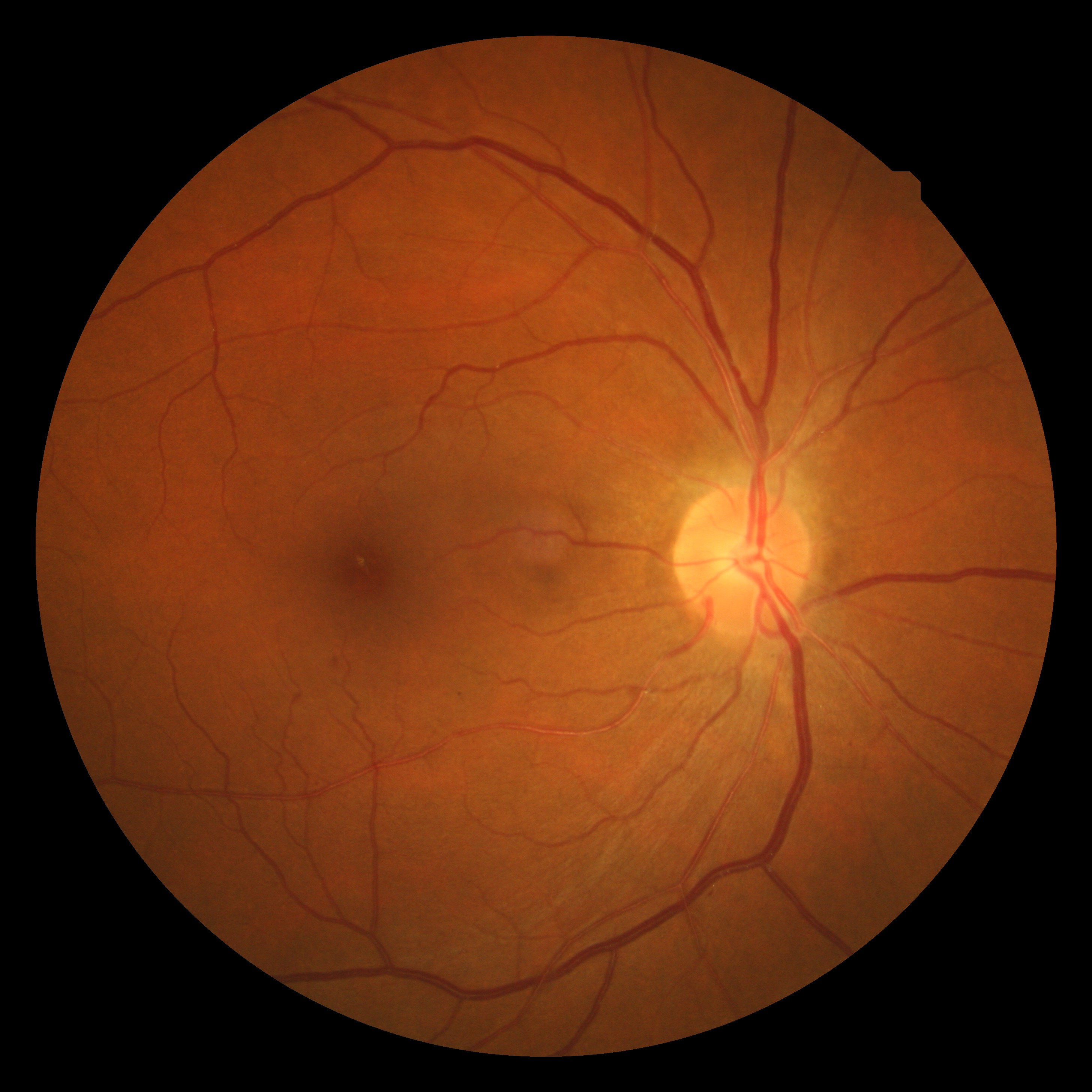
- Hypertensive retinopathy with AV nicking and mild vascular tortuosity
- Synonyms: AV nicking
- Test of: Retina

Arteriovenous nicking, also known as AV nicking, is the phenomenon where, on examination of the eye, a small artery (arteriole) is seen crossing a small vein (venule), which results in the compression of the vein with bulging on either side of the crossing. This is most commonly seen in eye disease caused by high blood pressure (hypertensive retinopathy).

It is thought that, since the arteriole and venule share a common sheath, the arteriole's thicker walls push against those of the venule forcing the venule to collapse. This makes the venule form an hourglass shape around the arteriole. Other theories suggest that this results not from compression from the arteriole but from sclerotic thickening or glial cell proliferation at the site where the two vessels cross.

Signs:

1. Gunn's sign - Tapering of veins
2. Bonnet sign- Banking of veins
3. Salus sign - Deflection of veins
