= Hypertensive retinopathy =

Damage to the eye's retina due to high blood pressure

- Other names: Latin: Fundus hypertonicus
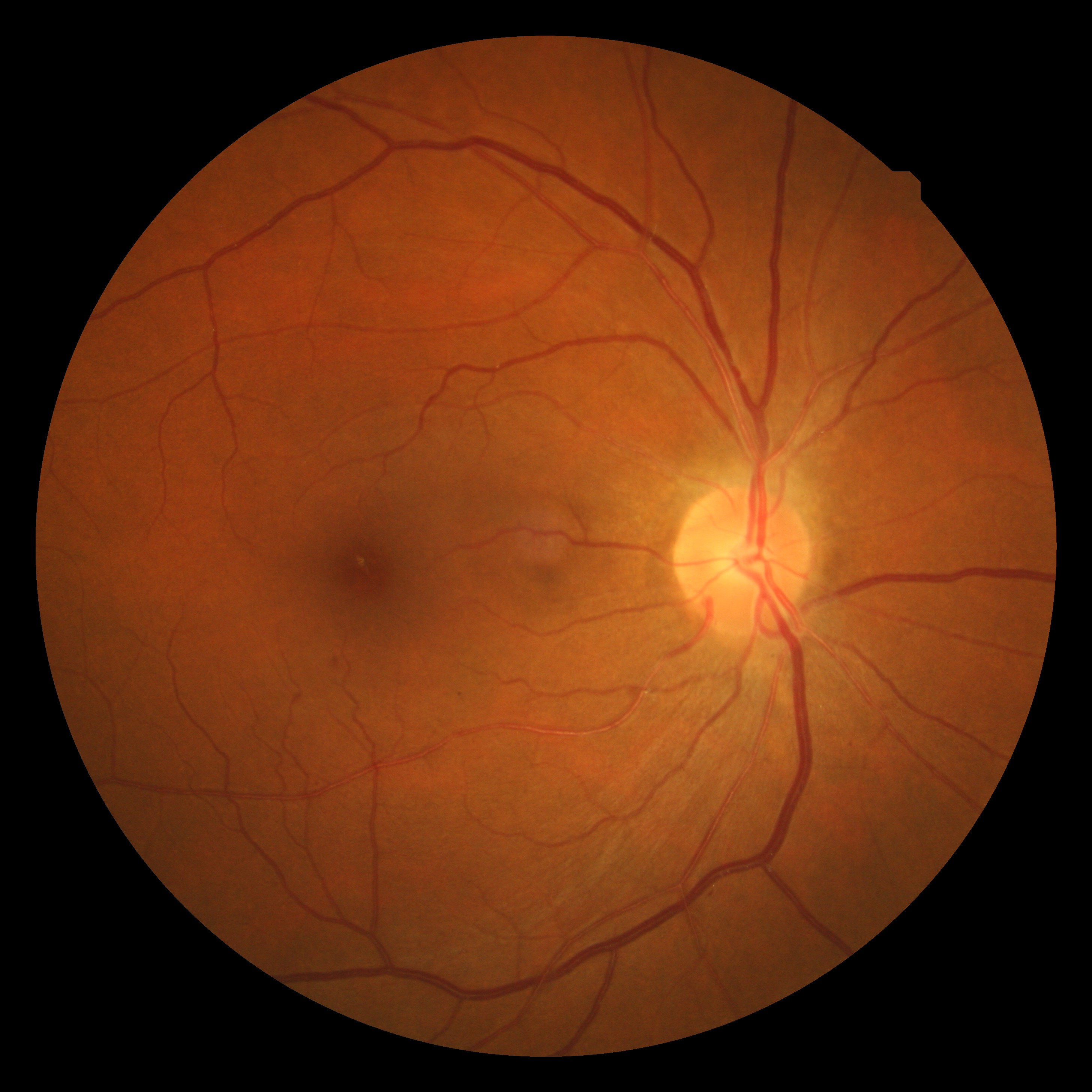
- Hypertensive retinopathy with AV nicking and mild vascular tortuosity
- Specialty: Ophthalmology

Hypertensive retinopathy is damage to the retina and retinal circulation due to high blood pressure (i.e. hypertension).

== Signs and symptoms ==
Most patients with hypertensive retinopathy have no symptoms. However, some may report decreased or blurred vision, and headaches.

Signs of damage to the retina caused by hypertension include:

Laser Doppler imaging of the papilla of a patient with hypertension

- Arteriolar changes, such as generalized arteriolar narrowing, focal arteriolar narrowing, arteriovenous nicking, changes in the arteriolar wall (arteriosclerosis) and abnormalities at points where arterioles and venules cross. Manifestations of these changes include Copper wire arterioles where the central light reflex occupies most of the width of the arteriole and Silver wire arterioles where the central light reflex occupies all of the width of the arteriole, and "arterio-venular (AV) nicking" or "AV nipping", due to venous constriction and banking.
- Advanced retinopathy lesions, such as microaneurysms, blot hemorrhages and/or flame hemorrhages, ischemic changes (e.g. "cotton wool spots"), hard exudates and in severe cases swelling of the optic disc (optic disc edema), a ring of exudates around the retina called a "macular star" and visual acuity loss, typically due to macular involvement.
- Strongly modulated blood flow pulse in central and branch arteries can result from hypertension. Microangiography by laser Doppler imaging may reveal altered hemodynamics non-invasively.

Mild signs of hypertensive retinopathy can be seen quite frequently in normal people (3–14% of adult individuals aged ≥40 years), even without hypertension. Hypertensive retinopathy is commonly considered a diagnostic feature of a hypertensive emergency although it is not invariably present.

== Pathophysiology ==
The changes in hypertensive retinopathy result from damage and adaptive changes in the arterial and arteriolar circulation in response to the high blood pressure.

== Diagnosis ==
Fundoscopy and patients history.

=== Differential Diagnoses ===
Several other diseases can result in retinopathy that can be confused with hypertensive retinopathy. These include diabetic retinopathy, retinopathy due to autoimmune disease, anemia, radiation retinopathy, and central retinal vein occlusion.

=== Keith Wagener Barker (KWB) Grades ===
Grade 1
Vascular Attenuation
Grade 2
As grade 1 + Irregularly located, tight constrictions – Known as "AV nicking" or "AV nipping" – Salus's sign
Grade 3
As grade 2 + Retinal edema, cotton wool spots and flame-hemorrhages "Copper Wiring" + Bonnet's Sign + Gunn's Sign
Grade 4
As grade 3 + optic disc edema + macular star "Silver Wiring"

There is an association between the grade of retinopathy and mortality. In a classic study in 1939 Keith and colleagues described the prognosis of people with differing severity of retinopathy. They showed 70% of those with grade 1 retinopathy were alive after 3 years whereas only 6% of those with grade 4 survived. The most widely used modern classification system bears their name. The role of retinopathy grading in risk stratification is debated, but it has been proposed that individuals with signs of hypertensive retinopathy signs, especially retinal hemorrhages, microaneurysms and cotton-wool spots, should be assessed carefully.

== Management ==
A major aim of treatment is to prevent, limit, or reverse target organ damage by lowering the person's high blood pressure to reduce the risk of cardiovascular disease and death. Treatment with antihypertensive medications may be required to control the high blood pressure.

== See also ==
- Hypertensive crisis
- List of systemic diseases with ocular manifestations
- Ophthalmology
- Optometry
- Ocular Manifestations of Non-Communicable Diseases in Nigeria

Ocular Manifestations of Non-Communicable Diseases in Nigeria
