= Ocular manifestations of non-communicable diseases in Rwanda =

Population-level mortality data for non-communicable diseases (NCDs) in Rwanda are primarily based on estimates. According to the latest information from the World Health Organization's Global Health Observatory, NCDs are responsible for approximately 36% of all deaths in the country. Among these, cardiovascular diseases contribute 13% of deaths, cancers account for 7%, diabetes for 2%, chronic respiratory diseases for 1%, while other non-communicable diseases make up the remaining 12%. Data from the Rwanda Health Management Information System (HMIS) indicate that cardiovascular diseases were the third leading cause of death in 2012, accounting for 8% of all deaths. Cancer was responsible for an additional 4% of deaths during the same period

== Retinoblastoma Prevalence in Rwanda ==
The worldwide burden of retinoblastoma has increased over time, with the number of cases rising from 4,674 in 1990 to 6,275 in 2021. During the same period, the age-standardized incidence rate (ASIR) increased from 0.076 to 0.094 cases per 100,000 population and is projected to continue growing in the future. However, the distribution of the disease varies considerably across regions. Eastern Sub-Saharan Africa bears the highest burden of retinoblastoma, whereas Australasia reports some of the lowest incidence rates. In Sub-Saharan Africa, retinoblastoma occurs in approximately one out of every 15,000 live births, compared with one out of every 20,000 births in high-income countries(HIC's), indicating that a greater number of cases are expected in the region.An earlier study conducted in Rwanda roughly twenty years ago indicated that retinoblastoma accounted for around 11.1% of all cancers diagnosed in children, though the study did not explore the clinical characteristics or treatment outcomes of the affected patients. To date, Rwanda still lacks detailed, long-term data on how the disease presents, how treatment is distributed, what survival rates look like, and what gaps within the healthcare system are responsible for delays in diagnosis.A national cohort study of retinoblastoma patients in Rwanda reveals that survival rates remain low, primarily depending on when the child is diagnosed and how severe the disease is at presentation. Infants had significantly better survival outcomes, while children diagnosed at older ages faced much higher mortality rates—evidence of delayed diagnosis and advanced disease. The treatment intent was the strongest predictor of survival: patients receiving palliative care had the worst prognosis, highlighting the impact of late-stage disease detection. Bilateral retinoblastoma (affecting both eyes), which is often identified earlier, showed better survival rates after statistical adjustment.

== Diabetic Retinopathy in Rwanda ==
Diabetic retinopathy (DR) is the leading cause of blindness among individuals with diabetes and ranks as the fifth leading cause of blindness worldwide. Although the epidemiology of DR is well established in high-income countries, data from sub-Saharan Africa remain limited. In the United States, DR is the primary cause of vision impairment among adults aged 25–74 years, while its prevalence in India was estimated at approximately 22% in 2014. Across Africa, population-based studies have reported DR prevalence ranging from 30.2% to 31.6%, with proliferative DR occurring in 0.9–1.3% of cases and diabetic maculopathy in 1.2–4.5%. Hospital-based studies have shown wider prevalence estimates, ranging from 7.0% to 62.4% for DR, 0–6.9% for proliferative DR, and 1.2–31.1% for maculopathy. More recent studies reported DR prevalence rates of 28.4% in Zimbabwe and 16% in Ethiopia. In Rwanda, the national prevalence of type 2 diabetes mellitus is approximately 3.16%, with an annual mortality rate of 2%. Although information on ocular complications in rural Rwanda is scarce, studies from Kigali have reported that 20.4% of patients with renal failure requiring hemodialysis had type 2 diabetes mellitus, while the prevalence of diabetic retinopathy among patients with type 1 and type 2 diabetes was estimated at 23%.

A case-control study conducted between January and September 2019 across four hospitals in Rwanda enrolled 592 patients with type 2 diabetes mellitus, including 66 cases with diabetic retinopathy (DR) and 526 controls. The overall prevalence of DR was 11.2%, with mild non-proliferative DR accounting for the majority of cases (8.61%), followed by moderate non-proliferative (1.7%), severe non-proliferative (0.34%), and proliferative DR (0.5%). Cataract and diabetic maculopathy were reported in 13.2% and 3.7% of participants, respectively. The study identified prolonged duration of diabetes, poor glycemic control, elevated low-density lipoprotein (LDL) cholesterol, high triglyceride levels, and albuminuria as significant independent risk factors for DR. The findings highlight the importance of controlling these modifiable risk factors and promoting annual eye examinations to facilitate early detection and management of DR, cataracts, and maculopathy, thereby reducing vision loss and improving patients' quality of life.
