= Charcot–Bouchard aneurysm =

- Other names: Miliary aneurysms, Microaneurysms
- Specialty: Cardiology, endovascular surgery
- Diagnostic method: CT or MRI brain scan

Charcot–Bouchard aneurysms are aneurysms of the brain vasculature which occur in small blood vessels (less than 300 micrometre diameter). Charcot–Bouchard aneurysms are most often located in the lenticulostriate vessels of the basal ganglia and are associated with chronic hypertension. Charcot–Bouchard aneurysms are a common cause of cerebral hemorrhage. Charcot–Bouchard aneurysm rupture might be linked to senile plaque formation in the Alzheimer's disease.

Retinal microaneurysms are seen in conditions like diabetic retinopathy, HIV related retinal microangiopathy, sickle cell retinopathy, idiopathic macular telangiectasia etc. In diabetic retinopathy, due to breakdown in blood–retinal barrier, microaneurysms may leak plasma constituents into the retina, or it may thrombose.

== Signs and symptoms ==
If a Charcot–Bouchard aneurysm ruptures, it will lead to an intracerebral hemorrhage, which can cause hemorrhagic stroke, typically experienced as a sudden focal paralysis or loss of sensation.

== Pathophysiology ==
Charcot–Bouchard aneurysms are aneurysms in the small penetrating blood vessels of the brain. They are associated with hypertension. The common artery involved is the lenticulostriate branch of the middle cerebral artery. Common locations of hypertensive hemorrhages include the putamen, caudate, thalamus, pons, and cerebellum.

As with any aneurysm, once formed they have a tendency to expand and eventually rupture, in keeping with the Law of Laplace.

== Diagnosis ==
Charcot–Bouchard aneurysms are usually not detected by CT angiography. Retinal microaneurysms can be diagnosed using ophthalmoscopy, fundus photography, FFA, or OCT.

== History ==
Charcot–Bouchard aneurysms are named for the French physicians Jean-Martin Charcot and Charles-Joseph Bouchard. Bouchard discovered these aneurysms during his doctoral research under Charcot.

== See also ==
- Intracranial hemorrhage
