= Central retinal artery occlusion =

- Specialty: Ophthalmology, Neurology

Central retinal artery occlusion (CRAO) is a disease of the eye where the flow of blood through the central retinal artery is blocked (occluded). There are several different causes of this occlusion; the most common is carotid artery atherosclerosis.

== Signs and symptoms ==
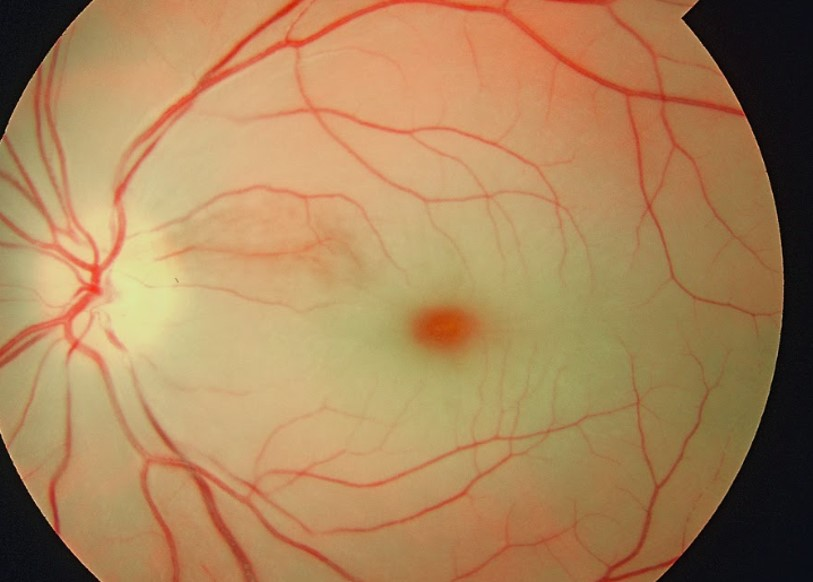
Cherry red spot in a person with central retinal artery occlusion

Central retinal artery occlusion is characterized by painless, acute vision loss in one eye. Upon fundoscopic exam, one would expect to find: cherry-red spot (90%) (a morphologic description in which the normally red background of the choroid is sharply outlined by the swollen opaque retina in the central retina), retinal opacity in the posterior pole (58%), pallor (39%), retinal arterial attenuation (32%), and optic disk edema (22%). During later stages of onset, one may also find plaques, emboli, and optic atrophy.

== Diagnosis ==
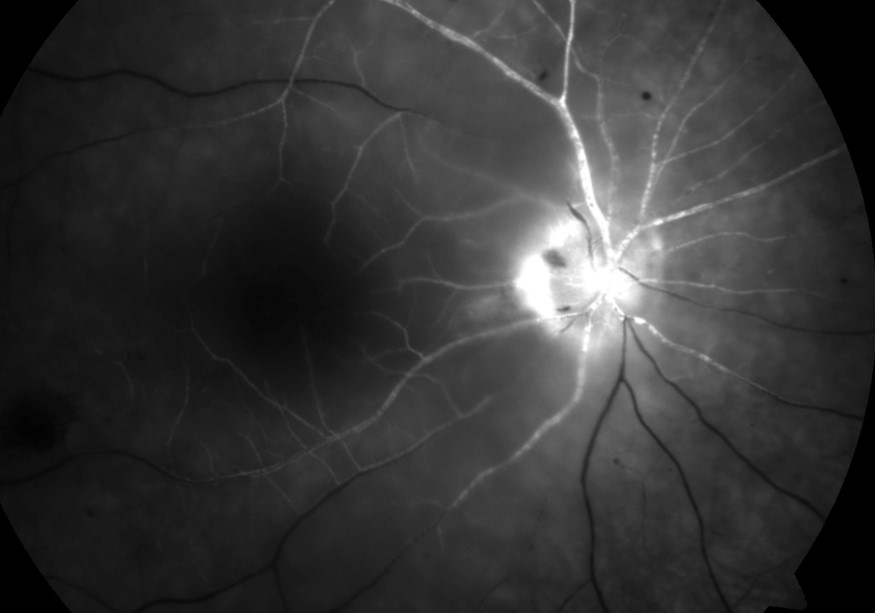
Fluorescein angiogram of a person with central retinal artery occlusion

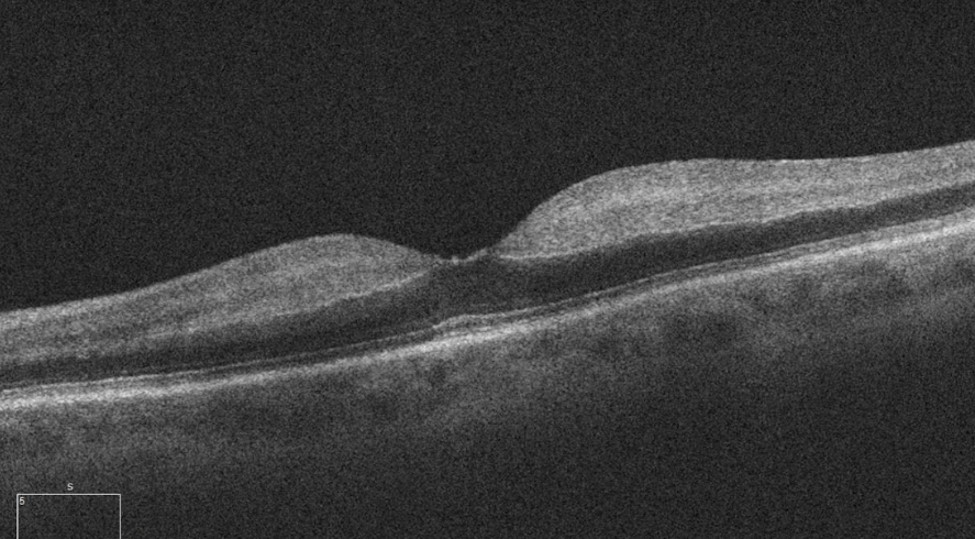
Ocular coherence tomogram (OCT) of a person with central retinal artery occlusion

One diagnostic method for the confirmation of CRAO is fluorescein angiography, used to examine the retinal artery filling time after the fluorescein dye is injected into the peripheral venous system. In an eye with CRAO some branches of the retinal artery may not fill or the time it takes for the branches of the retinal artery to fill will be increased, which is visualized by the leading edge of the fluorescein moving slower than normal through the retinal artery branches to the edges of the retina. Fluorescein angiography can also be used to determine the extent of the occlusion as well as classify it into one of four types non-arteritic CRAO, non-arteritic CRAO with cilioretinal artery sparing, transient non-arteritic CRAO and arteritic CRAO. Optical coherence tomography (OCT) may also be used to confirm the diagnosis of CRAO.

== Causes ==
CRAO can be classified based on it pathogenesis, as arteritic versus non-arteritic. Non-arteritic CRAO is most commonly caused by an embolus and occlusion at the narrowest part of the carotid retinal artery due to plaques in the carotid artery resulting in carotid retinal artery atherosclerosis. Further causes of non-arteritic CRAO may include vasculitis and chronic systemic autoimmune diseases. Arteritic CRAO is most commonly caused by giant cell arteritis. Other causes can include dissecting aneurysms and arterial spasms, and as a complication of patient positioning causing external compression of the eye compressing flow to the central retinal artery (e.g. in spine surgeries in the prone position).

== Mechanism ==
The ophthalmic artery branches off into the central retinal artery which travels with the optic nerve until it enters the eye. This central retinal artery provides nutrients to the retina of the eye, more specifically the inner retina and the surface of the optic nerve. Variations, such as branch retinal artery occlusion, can also occur. Central retinal artery occlusion is most often due to emboli blocking the artery and therefore prevents the artery from delivering nutrients to most of the retina. These emboli originate from the carotid arteries most of the time but in 25% of cases, this is due to plaque build-up in the ophthalmic artery. The most frequent site of blockage is at the most narrow part of the artery which is where the artery pierces the dura covering the optic nerve. Some people have cilioretinal arterial branches, which may or may not be included in the blocked portion.

== Treatment ==
While no treatment has been clearly demonstrated to be benefit for CRAO in large systematic reviews of randomized clinical trials, many of the following are frequently used:

- Lowering intraocular pressure;
- Dilating the CRA;
- Increasing oxygenation;
- Isovolemic hemodilution;
- Anticoagulation;
- Dislodging or fragmenting thrombus or embolus;
- Thrombolysis; and
- Hyperbaric oxygen.

To achieve the best outcome for a person with CRAO, it is important to identify the condition in a timely manner and to refer to the appropriate specialist.

== Prognosis ==
The artery can re-canalize over time and the edema can clear. However, optic atrophy leads to permanent loss of vision. Irreversible damage to neural tissue can occur after approximately 15 minutes of complete blockage to the central retinal artery, but this time may vary between people. Two thirds of people experience 20/400 vision while only one in six will experience 20/40 vision or better.

== Epidemiology ==
The incidence of CRAO is approximately 1 in 100,000 people in the general population. Risk factors for CRAO include the following: being over 50 years of age, male gender, smoking, hypertension, tranexamic acid, diabetes mellitus, dyslipidemia, angina, valvular disease, transient hemiparesis, cancer, hypercoagulable blood conditions, lupus, or a family history of cerebrovascular or cardiovascular issues.

== See also ==
- Amaurosis fugax
- Branch retinal artery occlusion
- Branch retinal vein occlusion
- Central retinal vein occlusion
- Ocular ischemic syndrome
