= Vitreous hemorrhage =

Leakage of blood into the internal fluid of the eye

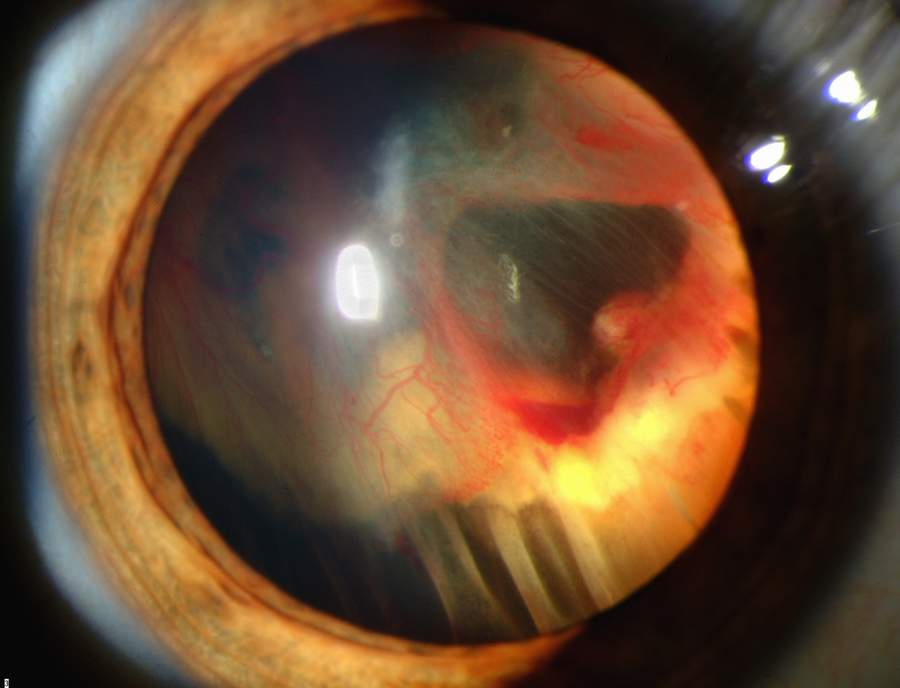
- Slit lamp photograph showing retinal detachment with visible vitreous hemorrhage.
- Specialty: Ophthalmology

Vitreous hemorrhage is the extravasation, or leakage, of blood into the areas in and around the vitreous humor of the eye. The vitreous humor is the clear gel that fills the space between the lens and the retina of the eye. A variety of conditions can result in blood leaking into the vitreous humor, which can cause impaired vision, floaters, and photopsia.

== Symptoms and signs ==
Common symptoms of vitreous hemorrhage include:

- Blurred vision
- Floaters – faint cobweb-like apparitions floating through the field of vision
- Reddish tint to vision
- Photopsia – brief flashes of light in the peripheral vision

Small vitreous hemorrhage often manifests itself as "floaters." A moderate case will often result in dark streaks in the vision, while dense vitreous hemorrhage can significantly inhibit vision.

== Causes ==
There are many factors known to cause vitreous hemorrhage.

=== Diabetic retinopathy ===
The most common cause found in adults is diabetic retinopathy. Abnormal blood vessels can form in the back of the eye of a person with diabetes. These new blood vessels are weaker and prone to breaking and causing hemorrhage. Diabetic retinopathy accounts for 31.5–54% of all cases of vitreous hemorrhage in adults in the United States.

=== Trauma ===
Some injuries can cause blood vessels in the back of the eye to bleed. Trauma is the leading cause of vitreous hemorrhage in young people, and accounts for 12–18.8% of cases in adults.

=== Retinal tear or detachment ===
A tear in the retina can allow fluids from the eye to leak in behind the retina, which causes retinal detachment. When this occurs, blood from the retinal blood vessels can bleed into the vitreous. Retinal tear accounts for 11.4–44% of vitreous hemorrhage cases.

=== Posterior vitreous detachment ===
As one gets older, pockets of fluid can develop in the vitreous. When these pockets develop near the back of the eye, the vitreous can pull away from the retina and possibly tear it. Posterior vitreous detachment accounts for 3.7–11.7% of vitreous hemorrhage cases.

=== Other causes ===
Less common causes of vitreous hemorrhage make up 6.4–18% of cases, and include:

- Proliferative sickle cell retinopathy
- Macroaneurysms
- Age-related macular degeneration
- Terson syndrome
- Retinal neovascularization as a result of branch or central retinal vein occlusion
- Other

== Diagnosis ==
Vitreous hemorrhage is diagnosed by identifying symptoms, examining the eye, and performing tests to identify the cause. Some common tests include:

- Examination of the eye with a microscope
- Pupil dilation and examination
- An ultrasound examination may be used if the doctor does not have a clear view of the back of the eye
- Blood tests to check for specific causes such as diabetes
- A CT scan to check for injury around the eye
- Referral to a retinal specialist

== Complications ==
- Ghost cell glaucoma: Secondary open angle glaucoma caused by degenerated red blood cells.

== Treatments ==
The treatment method used depends on the cause of the hemorrhage. In most cases, the patient is advised to rest with the head elevated 30–45°, and sometimes to put patches over the eyes to limit movement prior to treatment in order to allow the blood to settle. The patient is also advised to avoid taking medications that cause blood thinning (such as aspirin or similar medications).

The goal of the treatment is to fix the cause of the hemorrhage as quickly as possible. Retinal tears are closed by laser treatment or cryotherapy, and detached retinas are reattached surgically.

Even after treatment, it can take months for the body to clear all of the blood from the vitreous. In cases of vitreous hemorrhage due to detached retina, long-standing vitreous hemorrhage with a duration of more than 2–3 months, or cases associated with rubeosis iridis or glaucoma, a vitrectomy may be necessary to remove the standing blood in the vitreous.
