= Ocular ischemic syndrome =

Lack of blood flow within the eye

- Specialty: Ophthalmology

Ocular ischemic syndrome is the constellation of ocular signs and symptoms secondary to severe, chronic arterial hypoperfusion to the eye. Amaurosis fugax is a form of acute vision loss caused by reduced blood flow to the eye; it may be a warning sign of an impending stroke, as both stroke and retinal artery occlusion can be caused by thromboembolism due to atherosclerosis elsewhere in the body (such as coronary artery disease and especially carotid atherosclerosis). Retinal artery occlusion is also caused by a left atrial thrombus in patients with atrial fibrillation. Consequently, those with transient blurring of vision are advised to urgently seek medical attention for a thorough evaluation of the carotid artery. Anterior segment ischemic syndrome is a similar ischemic condition of anterior segment usually seen in post-surgical cases. Retinal artery occlusion (such as central retinal artery occlusion or branch retinal artery occlusion) leads to rapid death of retinal cells, thereby resulting in severe loss of vision.

== Symptoms and signs ==
Those with ocular ischemic syndrome are typically between the ages of 50 and 80 (patients over 65); twice as many men as women are affected. More than 90% of those presenting with the condition have vision loss. Patients may report a dull, radiating ache over the eye and eyebrow. Those with ocular ischemic syndrome may also present with a history of other systemic diseases including arterial hypertension, diabetes mellitus, coronary artery disease, previous stroke, and hemodialysis.

The condition presents with visual loss secondary to hypoperfusion of the eye structures. The patient presents with intractable pain or ocular angina. On dilated examination, there may be blot retinal hemorrhages along with dilated and beaded retinal veins. The ocular perfusion pressure is decreased. The corneal layers show edema and striae. There is mild anterior uveitis. A cherry-red spot may be seen in the macula, along with cotton-wool spots elsewhere, due to retinal nerve fiber layer hemorrhages. The retinal arteries may show spontaneous pulsations.

=== Complications ===
If carotid occlusive disease results in ophthalmic artery occlusion, general ocular ischemia may result in retinal neovascularization, rubeosis iridis, cells and flare, iris necrosis, and cataract. The condition leads to neovascularization in various eye tissues due to the ischemia. The eye pressure may become high due to associated neovascular glaucoma. An ischemic optic neuropathy may eventually occur.

== Causes ==
Severe ipsilateral or bilateral carotid artery stenosis or occlusion is the most common cause of ocular ischemic syndrome. The syndrome has been associated with occlusion of the common carotid artery, internal carotid artery, and less frequently the external carotid artery. Other causes include:

- Takayasu's arteritis
- Giant cell arteritis
- Severe ophthalmic artery occlusion, due to thromboembolism.
- Surgical interruption of anterior ciliary blood vessels supplying the eye, particularly during extensive strabismus surgery on 3 or more rectus muscles, leading to an anterior segment ischemic syndrome.

== Diagnosis ==
=== Differential diagnoses ===
- Central retinal vein occlusion
- Diabetic retinopathy: The presence of retinal hemorrhages, particularly in those who have diabetes, may also be caused by diabetic retinopathy. Given the bilateral nature of diabetic retinopathy, however, one should suspect ocular ischemic syndrome when retinal ischemia is unilateral.

== Treatment ==
Quick determination of the cause may lead to urgent measures to save the eye and life of the patient. High clinical suspicion should be kept for painless vision loss in patients with atherosclerosis, deep venous thrombosis, atrial fibrillation, pulmonary thromboembolism or other previous embolic episodes. Those caused by a carotid artery embolism or occlusion have the potential for further stroke by detachment of embolus and migration to an end-artery of the brain. Hence, proper steps to prevent such an eventuality need to be taken.

Retinal arterial occlusion is an ophthalmic emergency, and prompt treatment is essential. Completely anoxic retina in animal models causes irreversible damage in about 90 minutes. Nonspecific methods to increase blood flow and dislodge emboli include digital massage, 500 mg IV acetazolamide and 100 mg IV methylprednisolone (for possible arteritis). Additional measures include paracentesis of aqueous humor to decrease IOP acutely. An ESR should be drawn to detect possible giant cell arteritis. Improvement can be determined by visual acuity, visual field testing, and by ophthalmoscopic examination.

At a later stage, pan-retinal photocoagulation (PRP) with an argon laser appears effective in reducing the neovascular components and their sequelae.

The visual prognosis for ocular ischemic syndrome varies from usually poor to fair, depending on speed and effectiveness of the intervention. However, prompt diagnosis is crucial as the condition may be a presenting sign of serious cerebrovascular and ischemic heart diseases.

In 2009, the Undersea and Hyperbaric Medical Society added "central retinal artery occlusion" to their list of approved indications for hyperbaric oxygen (HBO). When used as an adjunctive therapy, the edema reducing properties of HBO, along with down regulation of inflammatory cytokines may contribute to the improvement in vision. Prevention of vision loss requires that certain conditions be met: the treatment be started before irreversible damage has occurred (over 24 hours), the occlusion must not also occur at the ophthalmic artery, and treatment must continue until the inner layers of the retina are again oxygenated by the retinal arteries.
