= Branch retinal vein occlusion =

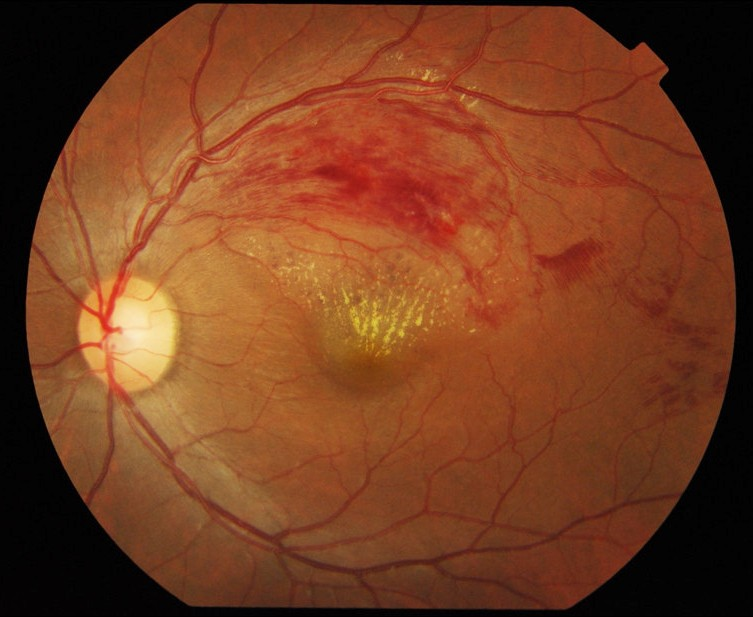
- Branch retinal vein occlusion
- Specialty: Neurology

Branch retinal vein occlusion is a common retinal vascular disease of the elderly. It is caused by the occlusion of one of the branches of central retinal vein.

== Signs and symptoms ==
Patients with branch retinal vein occlusion usually have a sudden onset of blurred vision or a central visual field defect. The eye examination findings of acute branch retinal vein occlusion include superficial hemorrhages, retinal edema, and often cotton-wool spots in a sector of retina drained by the affected vein. The obstructed vein is dilated and tortuous.

The quadrant most commonly affected is the superotemporal (63%).

Retinal neovascularization occurs in 20% of cases within the first 6–12 months of occlusion and depends on the area of retinal nonperfusion. Neovascularization is more likely to occur if more than five disc diameters of nonperfusion are present and vitreous hemorrhage can ensue.

== Diagnosis ==
Branch retinal vein occlusion revealed by laser Doppler imaging through flow alteration in the upper right branch artery.

The diagnosis of branch retinal vein occlusion is made clinically by finding retinal hemorrhages in the distribution of an obstructed retinal vein.

- Fluorescein angiography is a helpful adjunct. Findings include delayed venous filling, hypofluorescence caused by hemorrhage and capillary nonperfusion, dilation and tortuosity of veins, leakage due to neovascularization and macular edema.
- Optical coherence tomography is an adjunctive test in branch retinal vein occlusion. Macular edema is commonly seen on optical coherence tomography exams. Serial optical coherence tomograph is used as a rapid and noninvasive way of monitoring the macular edema.
- Laser Doppler imaging reveals dynamic hemodynamics discrepancies between branch arteries and veins, from local vascular resistance increase by the venous occlusion.

== Treatment ==
Several options exist for the treatment of branch retinal vein occlusion. These treatments aim for two of the most significant complications, namely macular edema and neovascularization.

- Systemic treatment with oral aspirin, subcutaneous Heparin, or intravenous thrombolysis have not been shown to be effective treatments for central retinal vein occlusion and for branch retinal vein occlusion no reliable clinical trial has been published.
- Laser treatment of the macular area to reduce macular edema is indicated in patients who have 20/40 or worse vision and did not spontaneously improve for at least 3 months (to permit the maximum spontaneous resolution) after the development of the vein occlusion. It is typically administered with the argon laser and is focused on edematous retina within the arcades drained by the obstructed vein and avoiding the foveal avascular zone. Leaking microvascular abnormalities may be treated directly, but prominent collateral vessels should be avoided. In a Cochrane Review comparing laser treatment to other treatments, grid laser was found to be preferable to no laser. Due to quality of evidence it is uncertain whether bevacizumab injections or subthreshold diode were preferable to grid laser treatments.
- The second indication of laser treatment is in case of neovascularization. Retinal photocoagulation is applied to the involved retina to cover the entire involved segment, extending from the arcade out to the periphery. Ischemia alone is not an indication for treatment provided that follow-up could be maintained.
- Preservative-free, nondispersive Triamcinolone acetonide in 1 or 4 mg dosage may be injected into the vitreous to treat macular edema but has complications including elevated intraocular pressure and development of cataract. Triamcinolone injection is shown to have similar effect on visual acuity when compared with standard care (laser therapy). However, the rates of elevated intraocular pressure and cataract formation is much higher with the triamcinolone injection, especially the higher dosage. Intravitreal injection of Dexamethasone implant (Ozurdex; 700.350 μg) is being studied, its effect may last for 180 days. The injection may be repeated however with less pronounced effect. Although the implant was designed to cause less complications, pressure rise and cataract formation is noted with this treatment too.
- Anti-vascular endothelial growth factor (VEGF) drugs such as bevacizumab (Avastin; 1.25–2.5 mg in 0.05 ml) and ranibizumab (Lucentis) injections are widely used and there is good evidence of improved visual and anatomic outcomes with these agents. Intravitreal anti-VEGF drugs have a low incidence of adverse side effects compared with intravitreal steroids, but are often requiring repeated injections. They are the treatment of choice for macular edema or neovascularization. The mechanism of action and duration of anti-VEGF effect on macular edema is currently unknown. The intraocular levels of VEGF are increased in eyes with macular edema secondary to branch retinal vein occlusion and the elevated VEGF levels are correlated to the degree and severity of the areas of capillary nonperfusion and macular edema.
- Surgery is employed occasionally for longstanding vitreous hemorrhage and other serious complications such as epiretinal membrane and retinal detachment.
- Arteriovenous sheathotomy has been reported in small, uncontrolled series of patients with branch retinal vein occlusion. Branch retinal vein occlusion typically occurs at arteriovenous crossings, where the artery and vein share a common adventitial sheath. In arteriovenous sheathotomy an incision is made in the adventitial sheath adjacent to the arteriovenous crossing and is extended along the membrane that holds the blood vessels in position to the point where they cross, the overlying artery is then separated from the vein.

== Prognosis ==
In general, branch retinal vein occlusion has a good prognosis: after 1 year 50–60% of eyes have been reported to have a final visual acuity of 20/40 or better even without any treatment. With time the dramatic picture of an acute branch retinal vein occlusion becomes more subtle, hemorrhages fade so that the retina can look almost normal. Collateral vessels develop to help drain the affected area.

== Epidemiology ==
- Branch retinal vein occlusion is four times more common than central retinal vein occlusion.
- Usual age of onset is 60–70 years.
- An analysis of population from several countries estimates that approximately 16 million people worldwide may have retinal vein occlusion.

== See also ==
- Branch retinal artery occlusion
- Central retinal vein occlusion
- Central retinal artery occlusion
