= Radiation retinopathy =

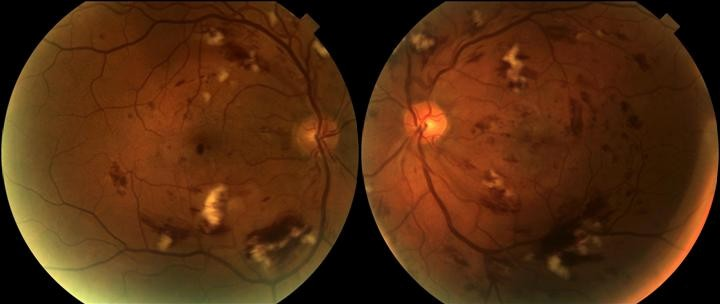
- Radiation retinopathy
- Specialty: Ophthalmology

Radiation retinopathy is damage to retina due to exposure to ionizing radiation. Radiation retinopathy has a delayed onset, typically after months or years of radiation, and is slowly progressive. In general, radiation retinopathy is seen around 18 months after treatment with external-beam radiation and with brachytherapy. The time of onset of radiation retinopathy is between 6 months to 3 years.

An exposure to doses of 30-35 grays (Gy) or more is usually required to induce clinical symptoms, however, retinopathy may develop after as little as 15 Gy of external-beam radiation. A reported safe dose is 30 Gy (3,000 rad): 10 Gy (1,000 rad) per week in five fractions of 2 Gy (200 rad).

== Signs and symptoms ==
Clinically, affected people may not have symptoms or may complain of decreased visual acuity. Ophthalmic examination may reveal signs of retinal vascular disease, including cotton-wool spots, retinal bleeds, microaneurysms, perivascular sheathing, capillary telangiectasis, macular edema, and disc edema. Capillary non perfusion, documented by fluorescein angiography, is commonly present, and extensive retinal ischemia can lead to neovascularization of the retina, iris, and disc. Staging of radiation retinopathy has been proposed.

== Pathophysiology ==
Radiation retinopathy is very similar to other vascular diseases. Diabetes and radiation primarily damage the retinal capillaries. Diabetes results in early loss of pericytes and thickening of the basement membrane. Radiation however, damages the endothelial cells.

== Treatment ==
The management of radiation retinopathy is similar to that for diabetic retinopathy and includes focal laser therapy to reduce macular edema or panretinal photocoagulation to treat zones of ischemia and neovascularization. Anti-vascular endothelial growth factors have been recently used for the treatment of radiation retinopathy. Monitoring of visual acuity in all cases and early referral to the ophthalmologist is warranted.
