= Branch retinal artery occlusion =

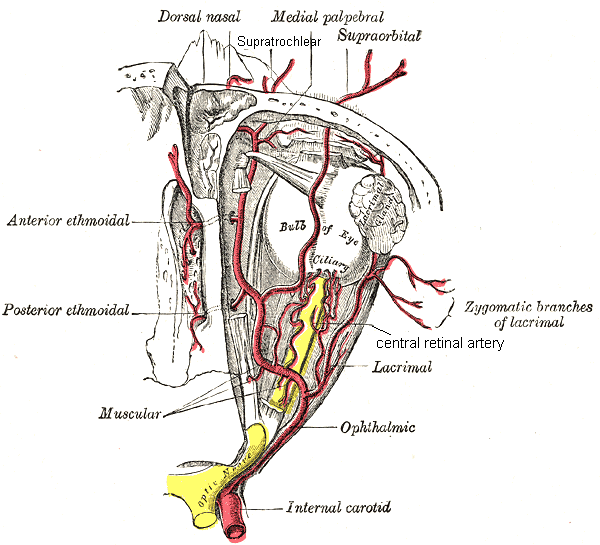
- Central retinal artery (at right)
- Specialty: Ophthalmology

Branch retinal artery occlusion (BRAO) is a rare retinal vascular disorder in which one of the branches of the central retinal artery is obstructed. Although often grouped together under one term, the condition consists of two distinct subtypes: permanent BRAO and transient BRAO.

== Signs and symptoms ==
Sudden painless partial vision loss

== Treatment ==
No proven treatment exists for branch retinal artery occlusion. In the rare patient who has branch retinal artery obstruction accompanied by a systemic disorder, systemic anti-coagulation may prevent further events.

== See also ==
- Branch retinal vein occlusion
- Central retinal artery occlusion
- Central retinal vein occlusion
