= Central retinal vein occlusion =

Blockage of the central retinal vein in the eye

- Diagram of the eye; retinal vein is number 21.
- Specialty: Ophthalmology

Central retinal vein occlusion, also CRVO, is when the central retinal vein becomes occluded, usually through thrombosis. The central retinal vein is the venous equivalent of the central retinal artery and both may become occluded. Since the central retinal artery and vein are the sole source of blood supply and drainage for the retina, such occlusion can lead to severe damage to the retina and blindness, due to ischemia (restriction in blood supply) and edema (swelling).

CRVO can cause ocular ischemic syndrome. Nonischemic CRVO is the milder form of the disease. It may progress to the more severe ischemic type. CRVO can also cause glaucoma.

== Diagnosis ==
Despite the role of thrombosis in the development of CRVO, a systematic review found no increased prevalence of thrombophilia (an inherent propensity to thrombosis) in patients with retinal vascular occlusion.

== Treatment ==
Treatment consists of Anti-VEGF drugs like Lucentis or intravitreal steroid implant (Ozurdex) and Pan-Retinal Laser Photocoagulation usually. Underlying conditions also require treatment. CRVO without ischemia has better visual prognosis than ischemic CRVO.

A systematic review studied the effectiveness of the anti-VEGF drugs ranibizumab and pagatanib sodium for patients with non-ischemic CRVO. Though there was a limited sample size, participants in both treatment groups showed improved visual acuity over 6 month periods, with no safety concerns.

== See also ==
- Branch retinal artery occlusion
- Branch retinal vein occlusion
- Central retinal artery occlusion
- Eylea
- Iridodialysis
- Ischemic optic neuropathy
