= Glaucoma valve =

Type of eye surgery procedure

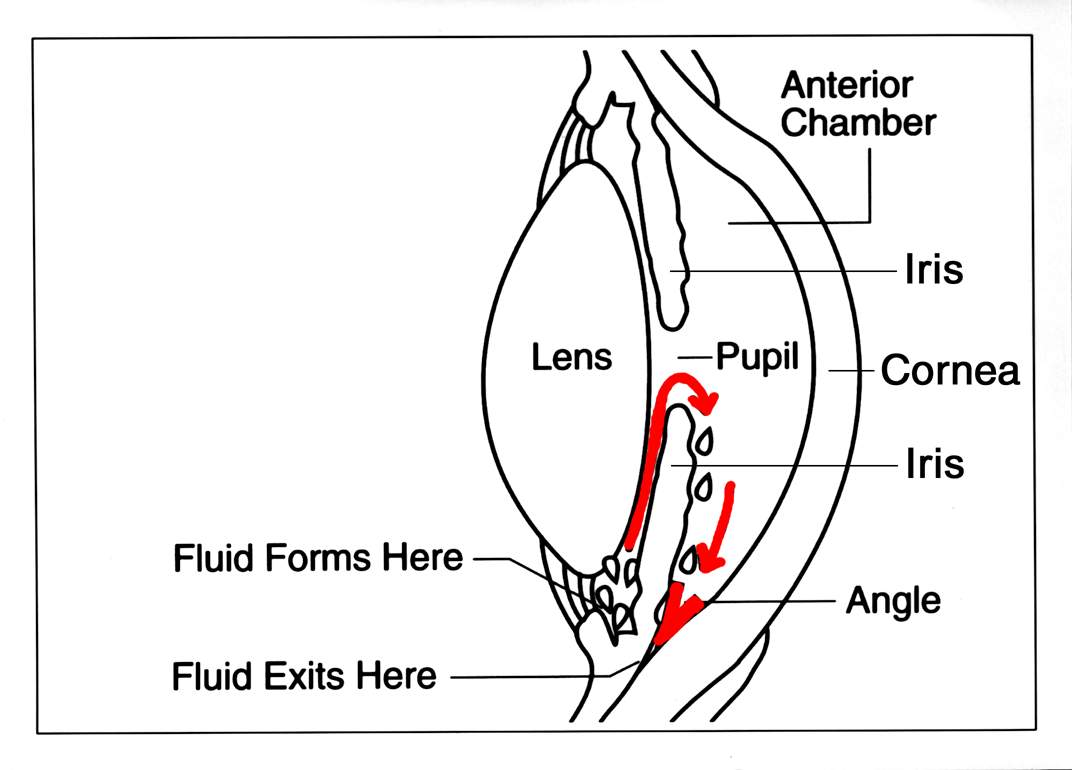
Flow of the aqueous humour

A glaucoma valve is a medical shunt used in the treatment of glaucoma to reduce the eye's intraocular pressure (IOP).

== Mechanism ==
The device works by bypassing the trabecular meshwork and redirecting the outflow of aqueous humour through a small tube into an outlet chamber or bleb. The IOP generally decreases from around 33 to 10 mmHg by removing aqueous on average 2.75 microliters/min.

== Types ==
The first glaucoma drainage implant was developed in 1966. Following on the success of the Molteno implant, several varieties of device have been developed from the original, the Baerveldt tube shunt, or the valved implants, such as the Ahmed glaucoma valve implant and the later generation pressure ridge Molteno implants. These are indicated for glaucoma patients not responding to maximal medical therapy, with previous failed guarded filtering surgery (trabeculectomy). The flow tube is inserted into the anterior chamber of the eye and the plate is implanted underneath the conjunctiva to allow flow of aqueous fluid out of the eye into a chamber called a bleb.

The ExPress Mini Shunt is a newer, non-valved device that was originally designed to provide a direct conduit from the anterior chamber to the sub-conjunctival space or bleb. In this position it was unstable and tended to erode through the conjunctiva. Now the more common use is as a modification of the trabeculectomy procedure, placed under a scleral flap, replacing the sclerostomy step.

In comparison to the glaucoma drainage devices that use an ab externo procedure, ab interno implants, such as the Xen Gel Stent, are transscleral implants to channel aqueous humor into the non-dissected Tenon's space, creating a subconjunctival drainage area similar to a bleb. The implants are transscleral and different from more other ab interno implants that do not create a transscleral drainage, such as iStent, CyPass, or Hydrus.

A Cochrane Review of various aqueous shunts and modifications found that the Baerveldt implant may result in lower IOP than the Ahmed implant, but it was unclear if the difference in IOP reduction was clinically significant. The review suggests that practitioners should operate with the devices that they are most comfortable with, and have the most experience using.

== Indications ==
The glaucoma valve implant is indicated for glaucoma patients not responding to maximal medical therapy, with previous failed guarded filtering surgery or in cases where conventional drainage surgery is unlikely to succeed. Common situations where the use of a glaucoma implant as a primary procedure is indicated include

- Neovascular glaucoma – glaucoma associated with vascular disease of the eye (often diabetes).
- Cases of Uveitis – acute or chronic inflammation of the eye.
- Traumatic glaucoma – glaucoma associated with injury to the eye.
- Silicone glaucoma – glaucoma due to Silicone used to repair a detached retina.
- Infantile/Juvenile glaucoma – often associated with developmental defects of the eye.

== Surgical technique ==
The flow tube is inserted into the anterior chamber of the eye, and the plate is implanted underneath the conjunctiva to allow flow of aqueous fluid out of the eye.

- The first-generation Molteno and other non-valved implants sometimes require the ligation of the tube until the bleb formed is mildly fibrosed and water-tight. This is done to reduce postoperative hypotony – sudden drops in postoperative intraocular pressure (IOP).
- Valved implants such as the Ahmed glaucoma valve attempt to control postoperative hypotony by using a mechanical valve. Studies show that in severe cases of glaucoma, double plate Molteno implants are associated with lower mean IOP in the long term compared to the Ahmed glaucoma valve.
- Second and third generation Molteno implants incorporate a biological valve and studies show considerable improvement in postoperative outcome over the older style Ahmed and Molteno implants.
- Baervedlt shunts (non-valved) have been shown to have lower rates of surgical failure than Ahmed shunts (valved), this have may be related to the high rate of valve failure, or to the larger plate surface of the Baerveldt shunt.

== Complications ==
The majority of complications occur shortly after surgery. These are generally related to high pressure : (due to inflammation following surgery) or low pressure (too much aqueous flow through the tube). Periods of low pressure which are more associated with non-valved shunts, can cause retinal detachments, hypotony maculopathy or haemorrhages (bleeding). Periods of high pressures, which are more associated with valved shunts, are detrimental to the optic nerve. Long term complications of this surgery include diplopia(double vision) and corneal oedema.

There are also device related complications, which will require surgical revision. For example, erosion, where the conjunctiva erodes over the shunt leaving it exposed, the condition of which may be revised or prevented in advance by the use of amniotic membrane, The ologen collagen matrix facilitates tissue regeneration and its application over the site of device implantation can strengthen tissue recovery, reducing possibility of erosion.

When the device malfunctions it may need to be replaced. Possible scenarios include blockage, where a particle becomes logged in the tube line blocking flow; retraction, where the tube line slips out of correct position such that flow is inhibited or halted; valve failure, where the valve stops working blocking flow completely.

Surgical failure occurs due to the ongoing scarring over the conjunctival dissipation segment of the shunt may become too thick for the aqueous humor to filter through. This may require preventive measures using anti-fibrotic medication like 5-fluorouracil (5FU) or Mitomycin-C (during the procedure), or creating a necessity for revision surgery with the sole or combinative use of biodegradable spacer or collagen matrix implant. A Cochrane Review comparing aqueous shunt surgery with and without Mitomycin-C did not find benefit or harm associated with the intervention.

== See also ==
- Eye surgery
- Glaucoma surgery
