= Minimally invasive glaucoma surgery =

- Specialty: Ophthalmology

Micro-invasive glaucoma surgery (MIGS) is the latest advance in surgical treatment for glaucoma, which aims to reduce intraocular pressure by either increasing outflow of aqueous humor or reducing its production. MIGS comprises a group of surgical procedures which share common features. MIGS procedures involve a minimally invasive approach, often with small cuts or micro-incisions through the cornea that causes the least amount of trauma to surrounding scleral and conjunctival tissues. The techniques minimize tissue scarring, allowing for the possibility of traditional glaucoma procedures such as trabeculectomy or glaucoma valve implantation (also known as glaucoma drainage device) to be performed in the future if needed.

Traditional glaucoma surgery generally involves an external (ab externo) approach through the conjunctiva and sclera; however, MIGS procedures reach their surgical target from an internal (ab interno) route, typically through a self-sealing corneal incision. By performing the procedure from an internal approach, MIGS procedures often reduce discomfort and lead to more rapid recovery periods. While MIGS procedures offer fewer side effects, the procedures tend to result in less intraocular pressure (IOP) lowering than with trabeculectomy or glaucoma tube shunt implantation.

== Medical uses ==
Glaucoma is a group of eye disorders in which there is a chronic and progressive damage of the optic nerve. Increased intraocular pressure (IOP) is the main and only modifiable risk factor, attributed to the progression of the disease. During the last 25 years, glaucoma management has been based in the use of pharmaceutical therapies and incisional surgery. MIGS procedures can provide the patient sustained IOP reduction while minimizing the risk and complications associated with glaucoma interventions and decrease the dependence of glaucoma medications.

== Adverse events ==
MIGS procedures offer an excellent safety profile, with minimal incidence of complications, especially when compared with other forms of glaucoma surgery.

== Procedures ==
MIGS objective, like all glaucoma surgeries, is to achieve lowering of IOP by either increasing aqueous humour outflow, the fluid that is produced by the eye and fills the space between the cornea and the lens, or decreasing the production of aqueous humour. MIGS encompasses numerous devices and techniques, including trabecular outflow and Schlemm's canal targeted interventions, suprachoroidal outflow, gonioscopy-assisted procedures, and subconjunctival shunts.

=== Micro-stent/shunt devices ===
==== iStent ====
The iStent Trabecular Micro-Bypass Stent, or simply iStent, is the smallest implantable medical device, designed to lower intraocular pressure by facilitating trabecular outflow of aqueous fluid. The trabecular outflow is one of the major outflow pathways for aqueous humor in the eye and has been the target of both pharmaceutical and surgical therapeutic approaches in glaucoma.

The 1-millimeter long iStent is a titanium device inserted via an internal approach through the trabecular meshwork into Schlemm's Canal, bypassing the trabecular meshwork and facilitating flow of aqueous from the eye. Studies have shown that the iStent is an effective procedure, typically lowering intraocular pressure to the mid-teens.

The iStent is the first MIGS device to get FDA approval for implantation in combination with cataract surgery. The device has also been shown to offer better IOP control than cataract surgery alone up to one year of follow-up in a large randomized controlled FDA study, although the effectiveness was significantly reduced by 2 years. Safety of the iStent was comparable to cataract surgery alone which is much better than conventional trabeculectomy. Common complications include failure to implant the device, touching the iris with the device, and touching the undersurface of the cornea (endothelium) with the device. Multiple studies have since confirmed the MIGS-type efficacy and safety profile of the iStent.

To address the reduced effectiveness at 2 years, some studies have been performed with multiple iStents.

A 2019 Cochrane Review found that individuals who receive iStents in combination with cataract surgery may be less likely than those who only receive cataract surgery to need glaucoma eye drops at medium-term follow-up; however, the evidence for this finding was of low quality. The trabecular micro-bypass stents have been approved for use in the UK by the National Institute for Health and Care Excellence (NICE).

==== CyPass micro-stent ====
The CyPass Micro-Stent is the first MIGS device developed for lowering of IOP through the suprachoroidal space (virtual space between the choroid and sclera created by implantation of the device), a part of the uveoscleral outflow pathway for aqueous humor. The uveoscleral pathway is an important pathway for aqueous outflow and drainage which can account for up to 57% of total outflow. Cyclodialysis cleft procedures were initially used to access this pathway with significant IOP lowering, but the cleft was prone to high anatomic variability as well as early postoperative closure due to the lack of a permanent drainage implant with a standardized and uniform conduit.

It has a microlumen of 300 micrometres (0.012 in) and is designed to augment outflow to the suprachoroidal space in order to control intraocular pressure; it is indicated for the treatment of primary open-angle glaucoma. The stent is implanted through an ab interno approach and inserted into the supraciliary space (between the ciliary body and sclera), effectively creating a controlled cyclodialysis cleft, which is kept open by the device.

The first clinical data on the device was presented in 2010 showed sustained IOP lowering and MIGS-like safety profile. This has been substantiated in subsequent studies in the combined setting with cataract surgery and as a stand-alone treatment for patients failing glaucoma topical therapy. Data from a large randomized controlled study has reported positive efficacy after 2 years of follow-up and will be submitted to FDA for approval. The CyPass device has been CE-marked since 2009.

The CyPass micro-stent was voluntarily withdrawn from the market by manufacturers Alcon in August 2018.

==== Hydrus ====
The Hydrus Microstent is an implantable MIGS device for the treatment of primary open angle glaucoma; implantation of this device can be performed in conjunction with cataract surgery. The Hydrus Microstent is the longest of the MIGS devices (8-millimeter long implant), and similar to the iStent it is designed to increase trabecular outflow.

The implant is inserted through the trabecular meshwork, thus bypassing resistance of aqueous flow through the tissue. However, other glaucoma surgeries, such as canaloplasty, have shown that mechanical dilation of Schlemm's canal is also associated with a reduction in intraocular pressure. The Hydrus Microstent takes advantage of this property by mechanically dilating and holding open Schlemm's Canal. The length of the Hydrus Microstent is thought to open approximately one quarter of Schlemm's Canal, routing aqueous into open downstream collector channels.

Clinical data from a randomized controlled study demonstrates efficacy of the device at 1 and 2 years. The Hydrus Microstent is currently being investigated in an FDA approved study for mild-to-moderate glaucoma.

==== XEN gel stent ====
The XEN Gel Stent is an implantable transscleral microsurgical device that allows the aqueous fluid to drain from the anterior chamber into the subconjunctival space, a pathway utilized by traditional trabeculectomy and glaucoma drainage device surgeries. Unlike the latter two procedures, the XEN Gel Stent is performed through an internal approach and avoids directly incising and disrupting the conjunctiva itself. The 6-millimeter stent is placed through the trabecular meshwork, with one end of the stent sitting directly underneath the conjunctiva, past the outer wall of the sclera. The inner tip of the stent sits in the anterior chamber, allowing a direct connection for aqueous to flow into the subconjunctival space. The stent is made of a non-bioreactive material, which does not promote scarring of the conjunctiva. The XEN Gel Stent was FDA approved on Nov 22, 2016.

==== PreserFlo MicroShunt ====
The PreserFlo MicroShunt (formerly known as the InnFocus MicroShunt) is a subconjunctival microshunt device designed to lower intraocular pressure by diverting aqueous humor from the anterior chamber to the subconjunctival space, thereby reducing the need for glaucoma medications.

A Cochrane systematic review published in 2019 found no randomized controlled trials comparing subconjunctival minimally invasive glaucoma devices, including the PreserFlo MicroShunt, with standard glaucoma surgery such as trabeculectomy, and concluded that the relative safety and effectiveness of these devices could not be determined based on the available evidence.

The device was originally developed under the name InnFocus MicroShunt and was subsequently renamed PreserFlo MicroShunt following its acquisition and further development by Santen Pharmaceutical.

=== Implant-free MIGS procedures ===
This group includes minimally invasive glaucoma procedures that do not involve permanent intraocular implants and act through different mechanisms, including enhancement of aqueous outflow and reduction of aqueous humor production.

=== Gonioscopy-assisted transluminal trabeculotomy (GATT) ===
Gonioscopy-assisted transluminal trabeculotomy (GATT) is a MIGS technique that involves circumferential incision of the trabecular meshwork via an ab interno approach, without the implantation of a permanent device.

The technique was first described by Grover et al. in 2014 as an ab interno adaptation of traditional circumferential trabeculotomy, using intraoperative gonioscopy to access Schlemm’s canal directly.

The procedure consists of creating an initial goniotomy, followed by advancement of a suture or microcatheter through Schlemm’s canal for 180° to 360°, resulting in controlled disruption of the trabecular meshwork and the inner wall of the canal.

GATT is primarily indicated for open-angle glaucomas, including primary open-angle glaucoma, pigmentary glaucoma, and pseudoexfoliative glaucoma, and may also be considered in selected cases of juvenile and secondary glaucomas.

Clinical studies have reported significant reductions in intraocular pressure and glaucoma medication burden following GATT, with a favorable safety profile when compared with traditional filtering surgeries.

The most commonly reported complications include transient hyphema and early postoperative intraocular pressure spikes, which are generally self-limited.

==== Endocyclophotocoagulation ====
Aqueous humor is produced in the portion of the eye known as the ciliary body. The ciliary body contains 72 protrusions known as ciliary processes, from which the aqueous is produced. The destruction of these ciliary processes with a diode laser, known as cyclophotocoagulation, can be used to decrease the amount of aqueous humor produced, thereby reducing the intraocular pressure.

Cyclophotocoagulation traditionally has been performed using an external laser through the sclera, known as transscleral cyclophotocoagulation. However, side effects of the transscleral approach can include significant inflammation, chronically low intraocular pressure, intraocular bleeding, and permanent shutdown of the eye, known as phthisis. Recent advances have now allowed a diode laser to be combined with a camera (endoscope) allowing for direct visualization of the ciliary processes during the ablation (Endo Optiks, Beaver Visitec, Waltham, MA).

Endocyclophotocoagulation is indicated for the treatment of both open and closed angle glaucoma and is performed in eyes which have already undergone cataract surgery or performed concomitantly with cataract removal. The largest investigation of endocyclophotocoaguation has shown a significant decrease in intraocular pressure of up to 10 mmHg, as well as a significant reduction in number of glaucoma medications needed. Reported adverse reactions include intraocular inflammation, bleeding, and cystoid macular edema (swelling of the retina). A Cochrane Review published in 2019 found no relevant published studies on endoscopic cyclophotocoagulation to assess its effectiveness compared to other surgical treatments (including other MIGS), laser treatment or medical treatment.

==== Trabectome ====
The Trabectome, or trabeculectomy ab interno, is a microsurgical device cleared by the U.S. Food and Drug Administration since 2006, used in patients with open angle glaucoma to excise a strip of trabecular meshwork, the tissue primarily responsible for the increased resistance of aqueous outflow in glaucoma. The Trabectome uses electrocautery via an internal approach to vaporize the trabecular meshwork, creating a large pathway for aqueous to flow, with minimal trauma to surrounding tissues. The procedure can be performed alone or in conjunction with cataract surgery.

Trabectome is unique among the MIGS procedures, as there is no physical device implanted inside the eye; the pressure lowering is a direct result from the destruction and removal of the trabecular meshwork. Studies have found a decrease in intraocular pressure to the mid-teens following the procedure, which has a favorable safety profile. The most common complication from Trabectome surgery is bleeding, which can blur vision and take extra time to recover. The surgery site can scar over time and the pressure can go back up. In early 2014, the NeoMedix received a warning letter from the FDA regarding marketing practices.

==== Excimer laser trabeculostomy ====
Excimer laser trabeculostomy is a procedure which creates holes in the trabecular meshwork to reduce intraocular pressure by using a excimer laser. First developed in 1987, a 2020 review of 8 studies found the procedure reduced intraocular pressure by 20-40% and had generally positive outcomes.
