= Canine glaucoma =

Optic nerve disease in dogs

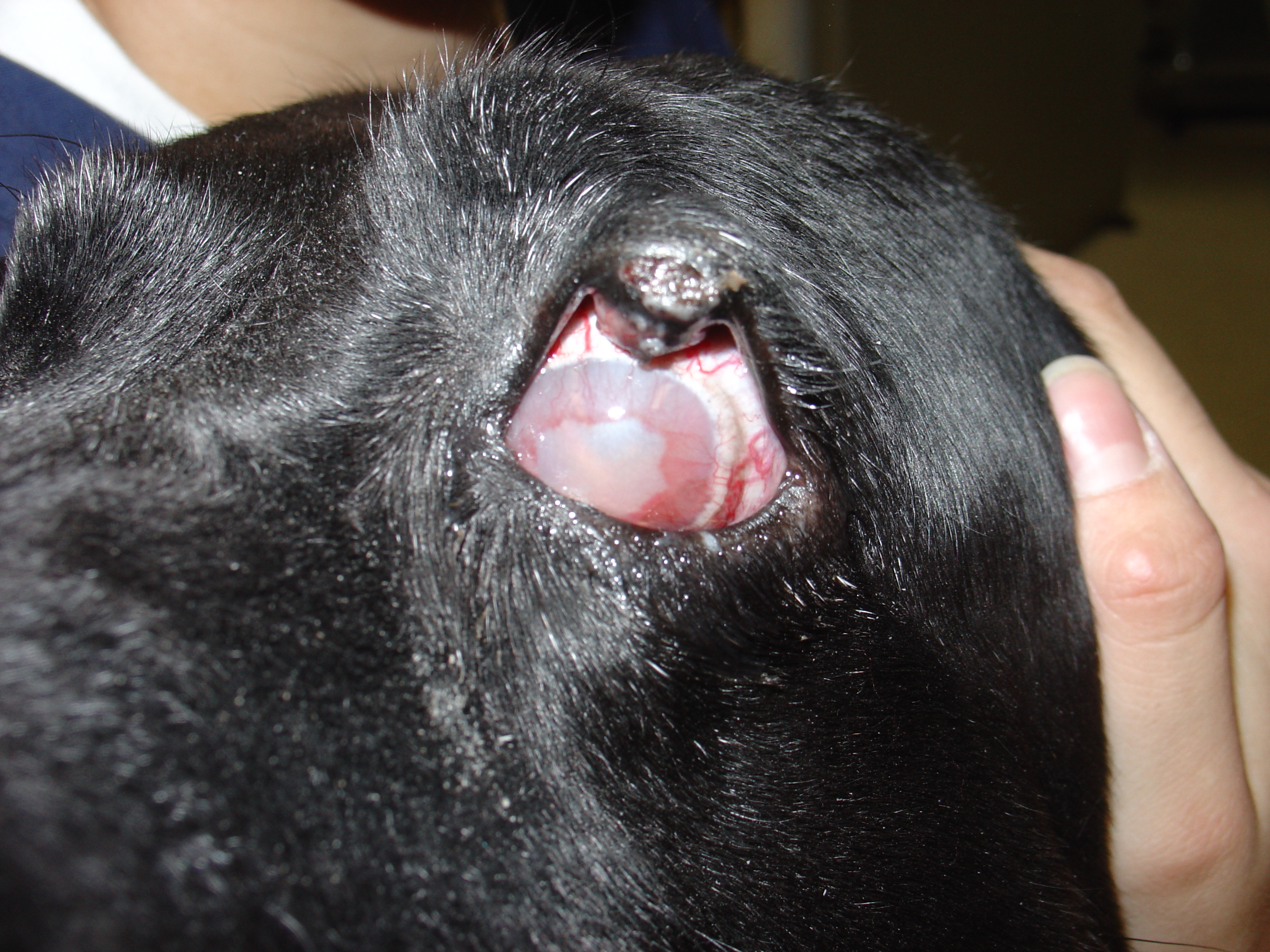
Glaucoma in a dog

Canine glaucoma refers to a group of diseases in dogs that affect the optic nerve and involve a loss of retinal ganglion cells in a characteristic pattern. An intraocular pressure greater than 22 mmHg (2.9 kPa) is a significant risk factor for the development of glaucoma. Untreated glaucoma in dogs leads to permanent damage of the optic nerve and resultant visual field loss, which can progress to blindness.

The group of multifactorial diseases which cause glaucoma in dogs can be divided roughly into three main categories: congenital, primary or secondary. In dogs, most forms of primary glaucoma are the result of a collapsed filtration angle, or closed angle glaucoma.

== Signs and symptoms ==
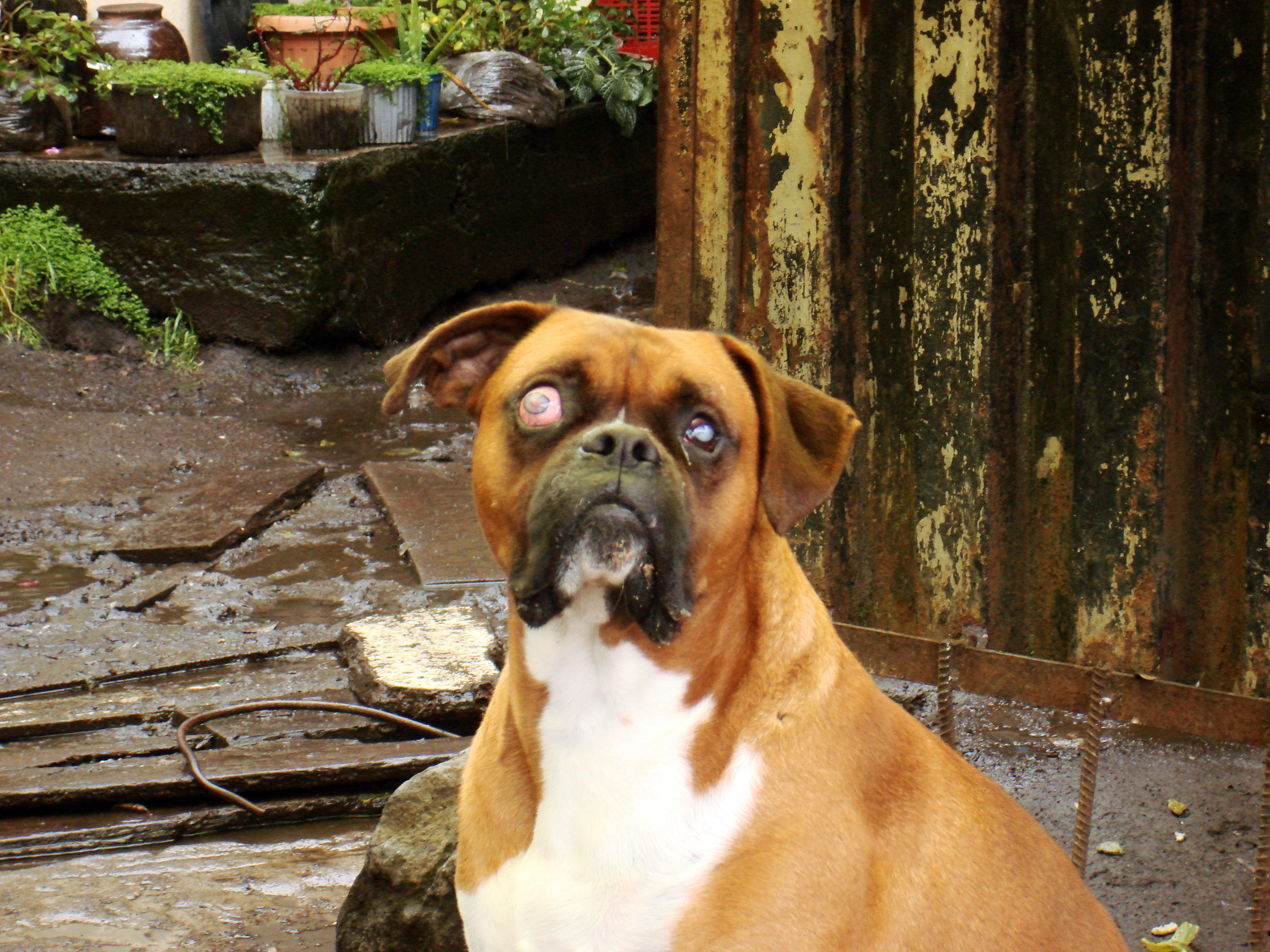
Dog with bulging and clouded right eye.

Glaucoma often goes unnoticed in dogs until it is in a more severe state. There are rarely any symptoms in the early stages of the disease so regular eye checks by qualified veterinary professionals are important. Dogs will sometimes rub the eye if it is painful. An eye affected with glaucoma may be red, swollen, sore, or become clouded in appearance.

== Causes ==
There are three broad categories of causes of glaucoma: congenital, primary and secondary.

Congenital glaucomas are present at birth, although they may not become apparent until the animal is a few months old. These types of glaucoma are due to abnormalities in the structures of the eye which occurred during ocular development. One or both eyes may be affected.

Primary glaucomas occur in the absence of other eye disease, and are therefore presumed to be genetic in origin. The most common type of glaucoma in dogs is primary angle-closure glaucoma (PACG). The least common type of glaucoma in dogs is primary open-angle glaucoma (POAG), although this is the most common type that affects humans. In the Beagle, POAG is an inherited autosomal recessive trait.

Secondary glaucomas occur when other eye diseases alter the flow of aqueous humor either into or out of the eye.

== Diagnosis ==
Veterinarians employ three general methods: tonometry, gonioscopy, and ophthalmoscopy. Tonometry measures the intraocular pressure with an instrument. Normal intraocular pressure in dogs can ranges from 12 to 25 mmHg (1.6 to 3.3 kPa), and both eyes should be similar in pressure. Gonioscopy is a diagnostic procedure to examine the angle of the anterior chamber. Direct and indirect ophthalmoscopy is necessary to evaluate the retina and particularly the optic nerve.

== Treatment ==
There is no cure for glaucoma, so the aims of treatment are to reduce pain in the eye, and to preserve vision. Most dogs are treated medically, although sometimes surgery is required. As the cause of primary glaucoma is often unknown, medical treatment is usually aimed at reducing the main sign of glaucoma (raised intraocular pressure) rather than at treating the cause of the disease.

=== Surgery ===
The aim of surgery in dogs with glaucoma is to reduce intraocular pressure. This is achieved by reducing aqueous humor production, or by improving drainage of aqueous humor from the eye.

==== Laser surgery ====
Laser surgery is often performed to selectively destroy the tissue, ciliary body, in an effort to reduce aqueous fluid production. Laser surgery can also be combined with placement of a shunt.

==== Enucleation ====
The eyeball is removed during this procedure, often reserved for patients with end stage glaucoma.

==== Intraocular evisceration and implantation ====
The inner contents of the eye are removed and replaced with an implant. The outer portions of the eye remain.

==== Canine specific intra-ocular shunt: TR-ClarifEYE ====
TR-ClarifEYE is an implant made of a biomaterial, the STAR BioMaterial, which consists of silicone with a very precise homogenous pore size, a property which reduces fibrosis and improves tissue integration. The implant contains no valves and is placed completely within the eye without sutures. In 2008 it had demonstrated long term success (> 1yr) in a pilot study in medically refractory dogs with advanced glaucoma

==== Valved shunts ====
Glaucoma drainage implants include the original Molteno implant (1966), the Baerveldt tube shunt, and the valved implants, such as the Ahmed glaucoma valve implant or the ExPress Mini Shunt and the later generation pressure ridge Molteno implants. These are used if dogs do not respond to maximal medical therapy, with previous failed guarded filtering surgery (trabeculectomy). The flow tube is inserted into the anterior chamber of the eye and the plate is implanted underneath the conjunctiva to allow flow of aqueous fluid out of the eye into a chamber called a bleb.

- The first-generation Molteno and other non-valved implants sometimes require the ligation of the tube until the bleb formed is mildly fibrosed and water-tight This is done to reduce postoperative hypotony—sudden drops in postoperative intraocular pressure (IOP).
- Valved implants such as the Ahmed glaucoma valve attempt to control postoperative hypotony by using a mechanical valve.

The ongoing scarring over the conjunctival dissipation segment of the shunt may become too thick for the aqueous humor to filter through. This may require preventive measures using anti-fibrotic medication like 5-fluorouracil (5-FU) or mitomycin-C (during the procedure), or additional surgery. And for Glaucomatous painful Blind Eye and some cases of Glaucoma, cyclocryotherapy for ciliary body ablation could be considered to be performed.

== Epidemiology ==
Glaucoma is more common as the age of the dog increases; primary glaucoma most commonly affects middle-aged to older dogs.

Some breeds have increased risk of certain types of glaucoma:

- Primary angle-closure glaucoma (PACG):
  - Most commonly affected: American Cocker Spaniel, Basset Hound.
  - Also over-represented: English Cocker Spaniel, Great Dane, Flat-coated Retriever, Shar Pei, Welsh Springer Spaniel, Bouvier des Flandres, Poodle, Chow Chow
- Primary open-angle glaucoma (POAG): Beagle, Norwegian Elkhound.
- Secondary glaucoma: Poodle, Cocker Spaniel, Rhodesian Ridgeback, Australian Cattle Dog, various terrier breeds (Cairn Terrier, Jack Russell Terrier, Boston Terrier).

PACG is twice as common in female dogs as in male dogs.
