= Glaucoma surgery =

Type of eye surgery

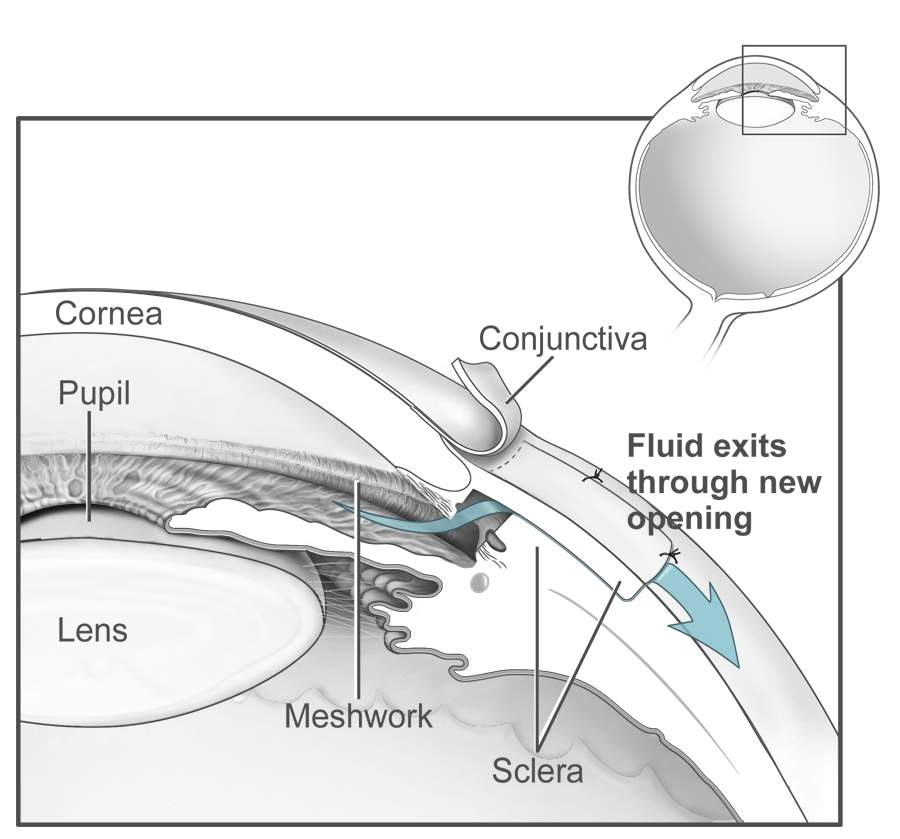
- Trabeculectomy for treating glaucoma
- ICD-9-CM: 12.1-12.7

Glaucoma surgery is a type of eye surgery performed to treat glaucoma, a group of diseases which affect the optic nerve, resulting in vision loss. Glaucoma is characterized by increased intraocular pressure (IOP). Most glaucoma surgeries seek to lower IOP by facilitating the escape of excess aqueous humor from the eye, while others decrease the production of aqueous humor.

== Procedures that facilitate outflow of aqueous humor ==
=== Filtering procedures ===
Filtering surgeries are the mainstay of surgical treatment to control intraocular pressure. An anterior sclerotomy or sclerostomy is used to gain access to the inner layers of the eye in order to create a drainage channel from the anterior chamber to the external surface of the eye under the conjunctiva, allowing aqueous to seep into a bleb from which it is slowly absorbed. Filtering procedures are typically divided into either penetrating or non-penetrating types depending upon whether an intraoperative entry into the anterior chamber occurs.

==== Penetrating filtering surgeries ====
Penetrating filtering surgeries are further subdivided into guarded filtering procedures, also known as protected, subscleral, or partial thickness filtering procedures (in which the surgeon sutures a scleral flap over the sclerostomy site), and full thickness procedures.

Trabeculectomy is a guarded filtering procedure that removes part of the trabecular meshwork. Full thickness procedures include sclerectomy, posterior lip sclerectomy (in which the surgeon completely excises the sclera in the area of the sclerostomy), trephination, thermal sclerostomy (Scheie procedure), iridenclesis, and sclerostomy (including conventional sclerostomy and enzymatic sclerostomy).

Anterior chamber paracentesis is a penetrating surgical procedure done to reduce intraocular pressure of the eye. It is limited in its time course and usually used to lower high eye pressure until a longer lasting pressure lowering procedure can be undertaken. This term is also used for a small entry made into the anterior chamber during eye surgery for access only, unrelated to intraocular pressure (IOP).

==== Non-penetrating filtering surgeries ====
Non-penetrating filtering surgeries do not penetrate or enter the eye's anterior chamber. There are two types of non-penetrating surgeries: Bleb-forming and viscocanalostomy. Bleb forming procedures include ab externo trabeculectomy and deep sclerectomy.

Ab externo trabeculectomy (AET) involves cutting from outside the eye inward to reach Schlemm's canal, the trabecular meshwork, and the anterior chamber. Also known as non-penetrating trabeculectomy (NPT), it is an ab externo (from the outside), major ocular procedure in which Schlemm's canal is surgically exposed by making a large, deep scleral flap. The inner wall of Schlemm's canal is stripped off after surgically exposing the canal. Deep sclerectomy, also known as nonpenetrating deep sclerectomy (PDS) or nonpenetrating trabeculectomy, is a filtering surgery where the internal wall of Schlemm's canal is excised, allowing subconjunctival filtration without actually entering the anterior chamber.

In order to prevent wound adhesion after deep scleral excision and maintain good filtering results, it is sometimes performed with a variety of biocompatible spacers or devices, such as the Aquaflow collagen wick, ologen Collagen Matrix, or Xenoplast glaucoma implant.

Viscocanalostomy is also an ab externo, major ocular procedure in which Schlemm's canal is surgically exposed by making a large, deep scleral flap. In the Viscocanalostomy procedure, Schlemm's canal is cannulated and viscoelastic substance injected (which dilates Schlemm's canal and the aqueous collector channels).

Where wound modulation is needed to prevent closure of surgically created drainage channels, adjuvants such as the ologen collagen matrix implants may be used to facilitate healthy tissue regeneration. Scar formation at the site of excision or operation may block aqueous humor circulation, while healthy tissue regeneration will keep newly created drainage channels functional.

=== Laser trabeculoplasty ===
A trabeculoplasty is a modification of the trabecular meshwork. Laser trabeculoplasty (LTP) is the application of a laser beam to burn areas of the trabecular meshwork, located near the base of the iris, to increase fluid outflow. LTP is used in the treatment of various open-angle glaucomas.

The two types of laser trabeculoplasty are argon laser trabeculoplasty (ALT) and selective laser trabeculoplasty (SLT). As its name suggests, argon laser trabeculoplasty uses an argon laser to create tiny burns on the trabecular meshwork. Selective laser trabeculoplasty is newer technology that uses a Nd:YAG laser to target specific cells within the trabecular meshwork and create less thermal damage than ALT. SLT shows promise as a long-term treatment. In SLT a laser is used to selectively target the melanocytes in the trabecular meshwork.

Though the mechanism by which SLT functions is not well understood, it has been shown in trials to be as effective as the older ALT. However, because SLT is performed using a laser with much lower power than ALT, it does not appear to affect the structure of the trabecular meshwork (based on electron microscopy) to the same extent, so retreatment may be possible if the effects from the original treatment should begin to wear off, although this has not been proven in clinical studies. ALT is repeatable to some extent with measurable results possible.

=== Iridotomy ===
An iridotomy involves making a puncture through the iris without the removal of iris tissue. Performed either with standard surgical instruments or a laser, it is typically used to decrease intraocular pressure in patients with angle-closure glaucoma. A laser peripheral iridotomy (LPI) is the application of a laser beam to selectively burn a hole through the iris near its base. LPI may be performed with either an argon laser or Nd:YAG laser.

There are studies which show no sufficient evidence of benefit on the use of iridotomy versus no iridotomy to slow down visual field loss in narrow angle glaucoma. This is based on analyzing four studies with a sample of 3,086 eyes of 1,543 participants. Iridotomy improves gonioscopic findings of narrowing of the anterior chamber angle, but does not show a clinically significant benefit regarding loss of visual field. Iridotomy may lessen the risk of closure of the anterior chamber and associated field loss resulting from very high eye pressure in primary angle closure glaucoma. (PACG).

=== Iridectomy ===
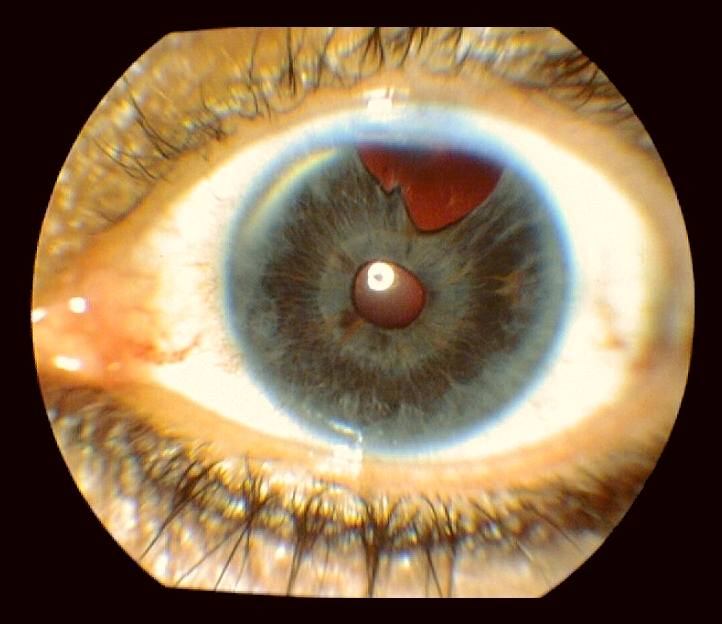
Eye after undergoing an iridectomy, with partial removal of the iris

An iridectomy, also known as a corectomy or surgical iridectomy, involves the removal of a portion of iris tissue. A basal iridectomy is the removal of iris tissue from the far periphery, near the iris root; a peripheral iridectomy is the removal of iris tissue at the periphery; and a sector iridectomy is the removal of a wedge-shaped section of iris that extends from the pupil margin to the iris root, leaving a keyhole-shaped pupil.

=== Clear lens extraction ===
Clear lens extraction, a surgical procedure in which clear lens of the human eye is removed, may be used to reduce intraocular pressure in primary angle closure glaucoma. A study found that CLE is even more effective than laser peripheral iridotomy in patients with angle closure glaucoma. Cataract surgery may also be used if the kens is cataractous.

=== Goniotomy and trabeculotomy ===
Goniotomy and trabeculotomy are similar simple and directed techniques of microsurgical dissection with mechanical disruption of the trabecular meshwork. Goniotomy procedures include surgical goniotomy and laser goniotomy. A surgical goniotomy involves cutting the fibers of the trabecular meshwork to allow aqueous fluid to flow more freely from the eye. Laser goniotomy is also known as goniophotoablation and laser trabecular ablation.

In many patients with primary congenital glaucoma, the cornea is not clear enough to visualize the anterior chamber angle. Although an endoscopic goniotomy, which employs an endoscope to view the anterior chamber angle, may be performed, a trabeculotomy which accesses the angle from the exterior surface of the eye, thereby eliminating the need for a clear cornea, is usually preferred in these instances. A specially designed probe is used to tear through the trabecular meshwork to open it and allow fluid flow.

=== Tube-shunt surgery ===
Tube-shunt surgery or drainage implant surgery involves the placement of a tube or glaucoma valves to facilitate aqueous outflow from the anterior chamber. Trabeculopuncture uses a Q switched Nd:YAG laser to punch small holes in the trabecular meshwork. Goniocurretage is an "ab interno" (from the inside) procedure that used an instrument "to scrape pathologically altered trabecular meshwork off the scleral sulcus". A surgical cyclodialysis is a rarely used procedure that aims to separate the ciliary body from the sclera to form a communication between the suprachoroidal space and the anterior chamber. A cyclogoniotomy is a surgical procedure for producing a cyclodialysis, in which the ciliary body is cut from its attachment at the scleral spur under gonioscopic control.

=== Ciliarotomy ===
A ciliarotomy is a surgical division of the ciliary zone in the treatment of glaucoma.

=== Canaloplasty ===
Canaloplasty is an advanced, nonpenetrating procedure utilizing microcatheter technology to enhance the eye's natural drainage system. An incision is made into the eye to gain access to Schlemm's canal in a similar fashion to a viscocanalostomy. A microcatheter will circumnavigate the canal around the iris, enlarging the main drainage channel and its smaller collector channels through the injection of a sterile, gel-like material called viscoelastic. The catheter is then removed and a suture is placed within the canal and tightened. By opening the canal, the pressure inside the eye can then be relieved.

Canaloplasty has two main advantages of over more traditional glaucoma surgeries. The first of these advantages is an improved safety profile over trabeculectomy. As canaloplasty does not require the creation of a bleb, significant long-term risks such as infection and hypotony (extremely low eye pressure) are avoided. The second main advantage is that when combined with cataract surgery, the IOP is reduced even further than when done alone.

Long term (three year) results have been published both in the US and Europe demonstrating a significant and sustained reduction in both eye pressure and the number of glaucoma medications required for glaucoma control.

== Procedures that decrease production of aqueous humor ==
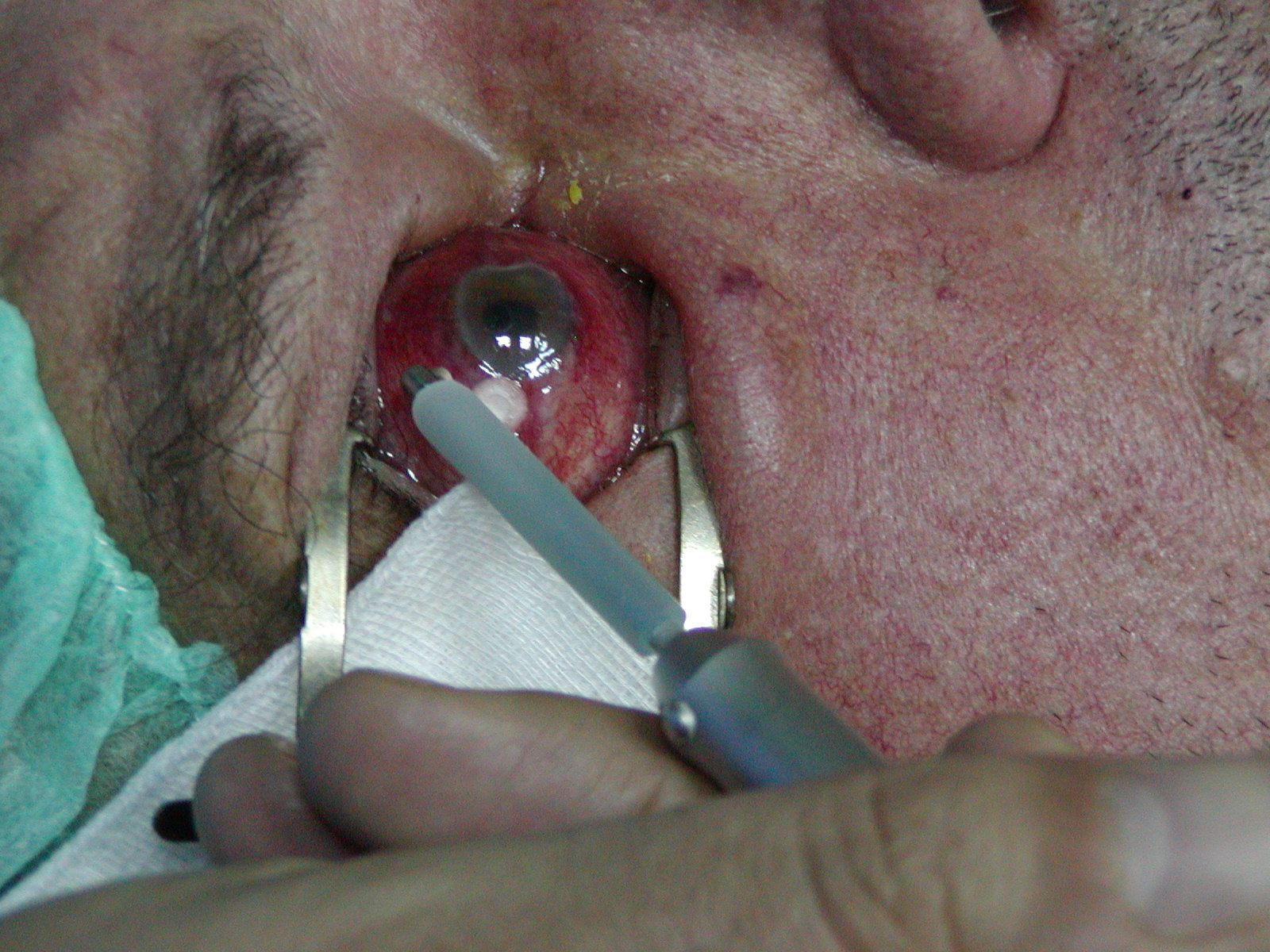
Cyclocryotherapy (frozen spot visible)

Certain cells within the eye's ciliary body produce aqueous humor. A ciliary destructive or cyclodestructive procedure is one that aims to destroy those cells in order to reduce intraocular pressure.

Cyclocryotherapy, or cyclocryopexy, uses a freezing probe. Cyclophotocoagulation, also known as transscleral cyclophotocoagulation, ciliary body ablation, cyclophotoablation, and cyclophototherapy, uses a laser. Cyclodiathermy uses heat generated from a high frequency alternating electric current passed through the tissue, while cycloelectrolysis uses the chemical action caused by a direct current.

A systematic review seeking to assess the safety and effectiveness of diode transscleral cyclophotocoagulation found one study in Ghana comparing patients who received low-energy versus high-energy variations of the procedure to treat glaucoma. Overall, the review found that 47% of eyes treated with transscleral cytophotocoagulation saw an IOP decrease of at least 20%. There were no differences between the low-energy and high-energy variations of the procedure in all reported outcomes, such as IOP control, and number of medications used after treatment. Another Cochrane Systematic Review explored whether cyclodestructive procedures are better than other glaucoma treatments for the treatment of refractory glaucoma; however, the evidence was inconclusive.

== See also ==
- Minimally invasive glaucoma surgery
- Eye surgery
