= Trabeculectomy =

Surgical removal of trabecular tissue in the eye

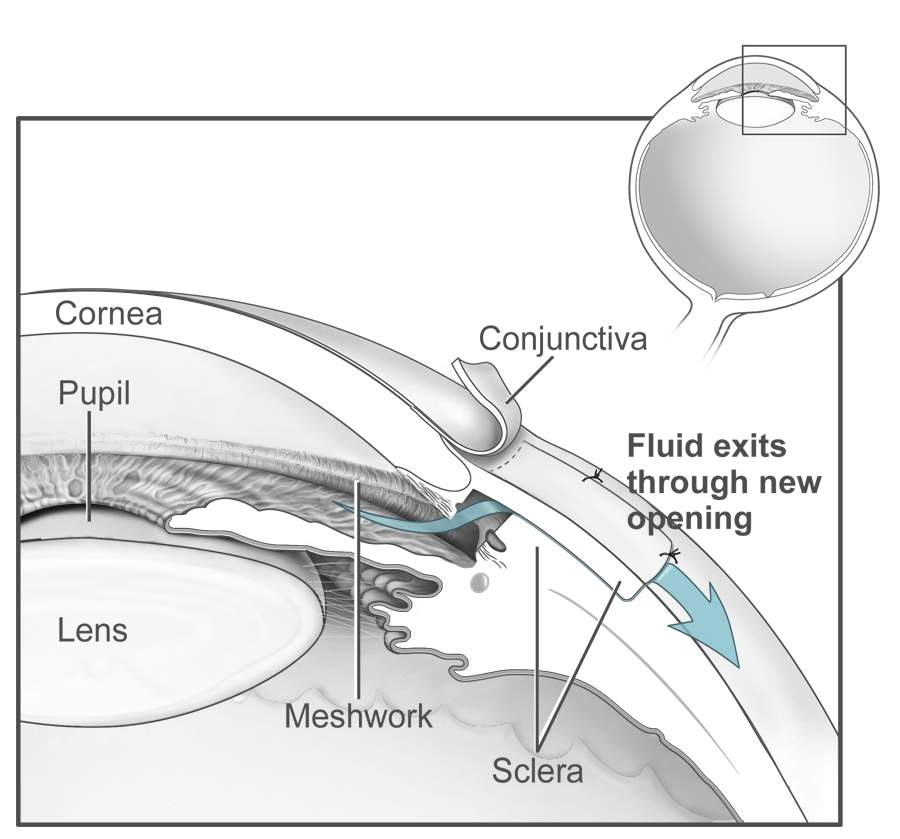
- Trabeculectomy for treating glaucoma
- ICD-9-CM: 12.64
- MeSH: D014130

Trabeculectomy is a surgical procedure used in the treatment of glaucoma to relieve intraocular pressure by removing part of the eye's trabecular meshwork and adjacent structures. It is the most common glaucoma surgery performed and allows drainage of aqueous humor from within the eye to underneath the conjunctiva where it is absorbed. This outpatient procedure was most commonly performed under monitored anesthesia care using a retrobulbar block or peribulbar block or a combination of topical and subtenon (Tenon's capsule) anesthesia. Due to the higher risks associated with bulbar blocks, topical analgesia with mild sedation is becoming more common. Rarely general anesthesia will be used, in patients with an inability to cooperate during surgery.

== Procedure ==
An initial pocket is created under the conjunctiva and Tenon's capsule and the wound bed is treated for several seconds to minutes with mitomycin C (MMC, 0.5–0.2 mg/ml) or 5-fluorouracil (5-FU, 50 mg/ml) soaked sponges. These chemotherapeutics help to prevent failure of the filter bleb from scarring by inhibiting fibroblast proliferation. Alternatively, non-chemotherapeutic adjuvants can be implemented to prevent super scarring by wound modulation, such as the ologen collagen matrix implant. Some surgeons prefer "fornix-based" conjunctival incisions while others use "limbus-based" construction at the corneoscleral junction which may allow easier access in eyes with deep sulci. A partial thickness flap with its base at the corneoscleral junction is then made in the sclera after careful cauterization of the flap area, and a window opening is created under the flap with a Kelly-punch to remove a portion of the sclera, Schlemm's canal and the trabecular meshwork to enter the anterior chamber. Because of the fluid egress the iris will partially prolapse through the sclerostomy and is usually therefore grasped to perform an excision called iridectomy. This iridectomy will prevent future blockage of the sclerostomy. The scleral flap is then sutured loosely back in place with several sutures. The conjunctiva is closed in a watertight fashion at the end of the procedure.

== Mechanism ==
Intraocular pressure may be lowered by allowing drainage of aqueous humor from within the eye to the following routes: (1) filtration through the sclerotomy around the margins of the scleral flap into the filtering bleb that forms underneath the conjunctiva, (2) filtration through outlet channels in the scleral flap to underneath the conjunctiva,(3) Filtration through the connective tissue of the scleral flap to underneath the conjunctiva. Into cut ends of Schlemm's canal. (4) aqueous flow into cut ends of Schlemm's canal into collector channels and episcleral veins (5) into a cyclodialysis cleft between the ciliary body and the sclera if tissue is dissected posterior to the scleral spur.

== Postoperative care ==
Glaucoma medications are usually discontinued to improve aqueous humor flow to the bleb. Topical medications consist typically of antibiotic drops four times per day and anti-inflammatory therapy e.g. with prednisolone drops every two hours. A shield is applied to cover the eye until anesthesia has worn off (that also anesthetizes the optic nerve) and vision resumes.

Patients are instructed to call immediately for pain that cannot be controlled with over the counter pain medication or if vision decreases, to not rub the eye and to wear the shield at night for several days after surgery.

If 5-FU was used during surgery or if no anti-fibrotic agent was applied, 5 mg 5-FU daily can be injected in the 7–14 postoperative days. In the following days to weeks sutures that hold the scleral flap down can be cut by laser suture lysis to titrate the intraocular pressure down by improving outflow. In laser suture lysis a red light laser and a contact lens are used to penetrate noninvasively the overlying conjunctiva and cut the black nylon suture. Some surgeons prefer adjustable flap sutures during the trabeculectomy that can be loosened later on with forceps in a slit lamp office procedure.

== Postoperative challenges ==
- Flat bleb – will fail if not formed in first postoperative days; if early scarring is cause, subconjunctival 5-FU injections or wound modulation with ologen collagen matrix can prevent conjunctiva from adhering down the wound bed.
- Bleb leak – may cause flat bleb; leaking blebs can be revised with the use of ologen collagen matrix or bandage contact lens for several days followed by leak repair if necessary
- Flat anterior chamber – reform to prevent corneal decompensation; can often be done in the office at the slit lamp with viscoelastics used in cataract surgery
- Blebitis – if infectious can progress to devastating endophthalmitis
- Suprachoroidal hemorrhage – rupture of long posterior ciliary artery from progressive stretching with progressive serous choroidal detachment; usually occurs several days after trabeculectomy with acute pain often while straining
- Hypotony – wound revision
- Cataract formation – cataract surgery if visually significant
- Small encapsulated bleb – injection of subconjunctival MMC and lidocaine can balloon up adjacent conjunctiva followed by needle incision of the bleb side and bleb extension; alternatively or together, the use of biodegradable spacer or ologen collagen matrix implant may be implemented.

== Modifications ==
Trabeculectomy has undergone numerous modifications, e.g. filtering trepanotrabeculectomy (TTE), a modification of the operation after J. Fronimopoulos. A triangular scleral flap is created which is approximately one-half as thick as the sclera. Trepanation is performed with a 2 mm trephine. The scleral edge of the trepanation opening is heat-cauterized.

Additional deep scleral dissection can also be performed in the scleral bed with trabeculectomy, first introduced by T. Dada et al.; deep scleral excision is performed in non-penetrating filtering surgeries but not traditionally in trabeculectomy. The space created from the deep scleral dissection is proposed to accommodate certain biocompatible spacer or devices in order to prevent subscleral fibrosis and to maintain good filtering results in this modified operation.

Various devices have been used with trabeculectomy techniques with the goal of improving safety of the procedure, maintaining drainage of aqueous humor, and to maintain the patency of bleb. Examples of Trabeculectomy-modifying devices are Ex-PRESS, Gelfilm, XEN Gel stent, antifibrotic materials (e.g Ologen), ePTFE (expanded polytetrafluoroethylene) membrane and PreserFlo MicroShunt. Comparing each of these devices for effectiveness and safety is required. There is some low-quality evidence that usage of Ex-PRESS implant, a miniature stainless steel shunt, and human amniotic membrane as adjuncts with trabeculectomy have been associated with reduced intraocular pressure in patients after a one-year follow-up, compared to standard trabeculectomy. In addition, the PreserFlo MicroShunt may help prevent complications such as postoperative hypotony or bleb leakage; however, this technique may have a lower effectiveness at reducing intraoculur pressure compared to a standard trabeculectomy procedures.

== Research ==
Further research is needed to compare the effectiveness of trabeculectomy techniques. It is not clear if a fornix-based surgical approach has a different safety rating, complication rate, surgical failure rate, or effectiveness compared to a limbal-based conjunctival flaps technique.

Currently, there are no published trials which compare the efficacy and safety of ab interno trabeculectomy with Trabectome with other procedures for treating glaucoma. The first trial to do so is the TAGS randomised controlled trial which investigated if eye drops or trabeculectomy is more effective in treating advanced primary open-angle glaucoma. After two years researchers found that vision and quality of life are similar in both treatments. At the same time eye pressure was lower in people who underwent surgery and in the long-run surgery is more cost-effective.

== History ==
Peter Gordon Watson and John Cairns developed the trabeculectomy procedure in the 1970s.

== See also ==
- Eye surgery
- List of surgeries by type
