= Trabectome =

Surgical instrument for glaucoma surgery

The Trabectome is a surgical device that can be used for ab interno trabeculotomy, a minimally invasive glaucoma surgery for the surgical management of adult, juvenile, and infantile glaucoma. The trabecular meshwork is a major site of resistance to aqueous humor outflow. As angle surgeries such as Trabectome follow the physiologic outflow pathway, the risk of complications is significantly lower than filtering surgeries. Hypotony with damage to the macula (hypotony maculopathy), can occur with pressures below 5 mmHg, for instance, after traditional trabeculectomy, because of the episcleral venous pressure limit. The Trabectome handpiece is inserted into the anterior chamber, its tip positioned into Schlemm's canal, and advanced to the left and to the right. Different from cautery, the tip generates plasma to molecularize the trabecular meshwork and remove it drag-free and with minimal thermal effect. Active irrigation of the trabectome surgery system helps to keep the anterior chamber formed during the procedure and precludes the need for ophthalmic viscoelastic devices. Viscoelastic devices tend to trap debris or gas bubbles and diminish visualization. The Trabectome decreases the intra-ocular pressure typically to a mid-teen range and reduces the patient's requirement to take glaucoma eye drops and glaucoma medications (see references). The theoretically lowest pressure that can be achieved is equal to 8 mmHg in the episcleral veins. This procedure is performed through a small incision and can be done on an outpatient basis.

== Method ==
When abdomino-interno trabeculectomy is combined with cataract surgery, it is initially performed for optimal angle visualization. Corneal clarity is often damaged during cataract surgery, and this damage may only be noticeable during gonioscopy, when the light path through the cornea is longer. An iris-lanar clear corneal incision of 1.8 mm width is made approximately 2 mm in front of the surgical limbus. Cataract surgery uses a larger keratome that requires the incision to be closed, to reduce fluid leakage. No viscoelastic is used, as it can cause bipolar electrodes to carbonize during the incision. The patient's head is then turned away from the surgeon by approximately 40 degrees, and the microscope is turned to the same extent in the opposite direction.

Optimum gonioscopic trabecular meshwork visualization requires an angle of approximately 70 to 80 degrees between the microscope and the patient's eye. An incision is made, which is slightly gaping. This gaping encourages hypotony and enables easy identification of Schlemm's canal from refluxed blood. Trypan blue can also be used to stain the trabecular meshwork [18].

The trabectome handpiece is inserted, with irrigation turned on. If the anterior chamber is too shallow for it to be fully inserted, the irrigation ports in the metal sleeve can form the anterior chamber by resting against the outer edges of the incision, with the tip already inside the eye. Right-handed surgeons find it easiest to perform counterclockwise removal first. The trabectome is engaged in the trabecular meshwork. This is done with the tip angled 45 degrees upward, just in front of the scleral spur. This angle offers a pointed entry into the meshwork. The trabectome is then moved in a strictly parallel fashion, with no movement toward the wall of the canal. The handpiece is turned 180 degrees, completing the clockwise removal. The superior and inferior angle structures can be seen, and almost 180 degrees of meshwork are removed by tilting the goniolens toward the patient's brow and then toward their cheek. This can be done in reverse, depending on which eye is operated on.

Once complete, the trabectome is carefully removed from the eye. Viscoelastic is injected into the eye for pressurization, and to tamponade the reflux heme. If cataract surgery is to follow, the microscope and patient's head are returned to their initial positions. The existing access point is used, and a larger keratome is employed to create a larger incision, with a self-sealing biplanar wound [2].

== Training ==
Microincisional glaucoma surgery [3, 4] is conducted in a space that is approximately 200 times smaller than the space used to implant epibulbar glaucoma drainage devices [5] As such, this type of surgery is particularly challenging to learn. The deep venous plexus distal to the outer wall of Schlemm's canal, the iris root, the ciliary body band and the suprachoroidal space all risk being damaged during surgery. This damage can cause variable sequelae [6, 7].

To master this surgery, it is important to be able to visualize the angle, identify the correct target, avoid trauma and maximize meshwork removal. Microincisional glaucoma surgery does not yet have dedicated simulators or synthetic models such as those used in cataract surgery wet labs. Therefore, most aspiring surgeons in this field practice on glaucoma patients. This is despite reported complications being almost ten times as common toward the end of training [8].

A safe and low-cost training environment has recently been created, using pig eyes mounted on a model head. This allows trainee surgeons to track their progress objectively. The pig eyes are infused with diluted fluorescein to trace outflow. Fluorescein can diffuse through the trabecular meshwork, which allows flow speeds to be estimated in non-treated parts of the eye. A disadvantage of this method is that over time, diffusion also takes place through intact vascular endothelium, staining the extravascular space. Fluorescent beads can be used as an alternative, and are suitable in less time-sensitive, more beginner-friendly studies of ablation. However, unlike fluorescein, this method does not account for flow speeds or volume estimates.

== Set-up ==
There are several surgical steps that can be simulated and practiced for cataract procedures. These include positioning the patient's head, setting up the microscope, gonioscopic visualization of the angle and identification of Schlemm's canal. For the surgery to be performed correctly, the patient's headrest must be close enough to the microscope stand to accommodate the tilted view, and greater distance from it. Trainees can tell their patient that they would like to take a brief look at the angle of the eye. The surgeon should be seated temporally, and the patient's head tilted away by 30 degrees. The microscope should be set up by centering its head, confirming that the tilt knob is covered with a handle. The equipment is then tilted toward the surgeon by 30 degrees. The microscope should be manually lowered, bringing the limbus into focus.

To practice gonioscopic visualization of the angle, the correct handedness of the modified Swan Jacob gonioprism should be confirmed. This is done by placing it on the eye and moving the microscope focus down, toward the nasal angle. The iris root, ciliary body band and trabecular meshwork can be seen through the microscope. They should all be distinguished from Schwalbe's line and the Sampaolesi line. Schlemm's canal should be identified by using a 0.12 forceps to tap lightly on the posterior lip of the primary cataract incision, creating blood reflux. After several seconds, the goniolens should be replaced onto the cornea, to visualize a partially venous, blood-filled Schlemm's canal.

== Outflow enhancement ==
By removing the primary resistance (the trabecular meshwork), aqueous humor can pass more freely into collector channels and aqueous veins. The Goldmann equation states that Intraocular Pressure = [Aqueous Humor Formation/Outflow] + Episcleral Venous Pressure. This equation states that free-flowing aqueous humor should cause intraocular pressure to drop to the same level as in the episcleral veins [26]. However, this is rare, and the average postoperative intraocular pressure is around 16 mmHg [27]. Spectral domain optical coherence tomography can be used to view collector channel diameter change, collapse or patency.

Like human eyes, pig eyes have more outflow along the nasal drainage system than the temporal angle. Trabecular meshwork removal from the nasal can enhance outflow beyond physiological levels. It can also cause fluorescein to flow circumferentially, through small connections between Schlemm's canal-like segments, typical of a pig's angular aqueous plexus [3-5]. Reconstruction of outflow tracts via spectral domain optical coherence tomography have confirmed a correlation between aqueous spaces and collectors where flow was seen. However, these studies have also confirmed the existence of non-perfused vascular structures that could be part of the arterial or venous vascular system, or poorly perfused collector channels.

Recent discoveries have shown valve-like structures that appear to guard collector channel orifices and collapsible aqueous veins 9, 10. These findings contradict the view that collector channel openings are round and unobstructed. Structural data has shown that flaps are suspended by string-like attachments. This research suggests that these attachments should be maintained during surgery, or that the flaps at the opening of collector channels should be removed. Electron microscopic images of the outer wall suggest that most are removed during trabectome procedures, together with their attachments and the trabecular meshwork [30].

== Applications and results ==
=== Phacoemulsification combined with ab interno trabeculectomy ===
As many patients have both cataract and glaucoma, phacoemulsification is often combined with trabectome surgery, for the cost-effective treatment of both conditions [11]. Combined phaco-trabectome surgery can result in an intraocular pressure reduction of approximately 18% [12]. A recent study of phaco-trabectome surgery patients found the most significant reduction in cases of severe glaucoma, steroid-induced glaucoma [33,34] and pseudoexfoliative glaucoma [13, 14].

=== Ab interno trabeculectomy-only procedures for pseudophakic or phakic eyes ===
Trabectome surgery alone provides an alternative to more invasive procedures. It is suitable for patients who have previously undergone cataract surgery, as well as those who have no visually significant cataract. Studies have shown that lens status or performance of phacoemulsification in the same session has no significant impact on intraocular pressure reduction [38,39].

When comparing patients undergoing trabectome-only with those undergoing phaco-trabectome procedures, research has shown greater benefit in phakic or pseudophakic eyes after phaco-trabectome procedures [40]. However, phakic patients undergoing trabectome showed a greater reduction in intraocular pressure, compared to patients undergoing phacoemulsification combined with trabectome. These results suggest that phacoemulsification may not have a significant impact on intraocular pressure reduction [39].

=== Goniosynechiolysis and ab interno trabeculectomy for narrow angles and angle closure ===
Historically, angle-based glaucoma surgery in patients with narrow angles was thought more likely to result in synechiae and fibrosis. This was considered a contraindication to trabectome surgery. However, studies of trabectome and phaco-trabectome patients have proven that trabectome surgery can be successful even in these cases. Patients with an angle at Shaffer grade 2 or less (narrow) showed an average intraocular pressure reduction of 42% one year after trabectome surgery, and of 24% one year after phaco-trabectome. Patients with an angle at Shaffer grade 3 or above (open) showed an average intraocular pressure reduction of 37% reduction one year after trabectome surgery, and of 25% reduction one year after phaco-trabectome. These results suggest that trabectome surgery is a viable option for patients with narrow angles [15]

=== Failed trabeculectomy or tube shunt ===
Reoperation after failed trabeculectomy or tube shunt is very challenging. Trabectome surgery is a minimally invasive alternative to a repeat filter or shunt. Studies of patients undergoing trabectome surgery after a failed tube shunt have shown a statistically significant reduction in intraocular pressure after one year [42].

When comparing patients undergoing trabectome surgery after failed trabeculectomy with those undergoing phaco-trabectome, research has shown a greater reduction in intraocular pressure after trabectome than after phaco-trabectome [43]. Further research has shown trabectome surgery after failed trabeculectomy to result in an intraocular pressure reduction of 36%, and a 14% decrease in the number of pressure-lowering medications. 25% of patients were seen to require further surgery [44].

=== Ab interno trabeculectomy at the time of tube shunt implantation ===
Trabectome surgery has also proven to be a valuable adjuvant at the point of both valved and non-valved tube shunt implantation. When comparing patients undergoing Baerveldt tube implantation alone with those undergoing the same procedure combined with trabectome surgery, both groups showed similar intraocular pressure and visual acuities after the procedures. The combined patients required fewer pressure-lowering drops. These results show that trabectome surgery could improve post-operative quality of life by reducing necessary medication [16]. Results from Ahmed tube implantations showed a similar trend [46].

=== Ab interno trabeculectomy for severe glaucoma ===
When trabectome surgery results are correlated with glaucoma severity, patients with more medication, higher intraocular pressure and worse visual field experience a larger reduction in intraocular pressure than those with less aggressive glaucoma [33,37]. Studies have shown patients with the most advanced glaucoma to have a pressure reduction three times greater than those with mild glaucoma. Individuals with advanced glaucoma have been shown to have a lower success rate than those with mild glaucoma. This risk of failure is important when trabectome surgery is considered as a less risky alternative to traditional procedures. Other factors which have been linked to intraocular pressure reduction are age, Hispanic ethnicity, steroid-induced glaucoma and cup disk ratio [37]. Contradictory results have, however, been presented in the cases of ethnicity and the cup disk ratio [17].

== Complications ==
The trabectome is very safe, particularly when compared to incisional glaucoma surgery. Recent research has shown the most common complications to include hyphema, peripheral anterior synechiae, corneal injury and temporary spikes in intraocular pressure. Less common complications include transient hypotony lasting less than 3 months, iris injury, cystoid macular edema and cataract progression. There are case reports of a few, rare complications, including cyclodialysis cleft, aqueous misdirection, choroidal hemorrhage and endophthalmitis [18].
