= Buphthalmos =

- This condition is inherited in an autosomal recessive manner
- Specialty: Ophthalmology

Buphthalmos (plural: buphthalmoses) is enlargement of the eyeball and is most commonly seen in infants and young children. It is sometimes referred to as buphthalmia (plural buphthalmias). It usually appears in the newborn period or the first 3 months of life. and in most cases indicates the presence of congenital (infantile) glaucoma, which is a disorder in which elevated pressures within the eye lead to structural eye damage and vision loss.

== Signs and symptoms ==
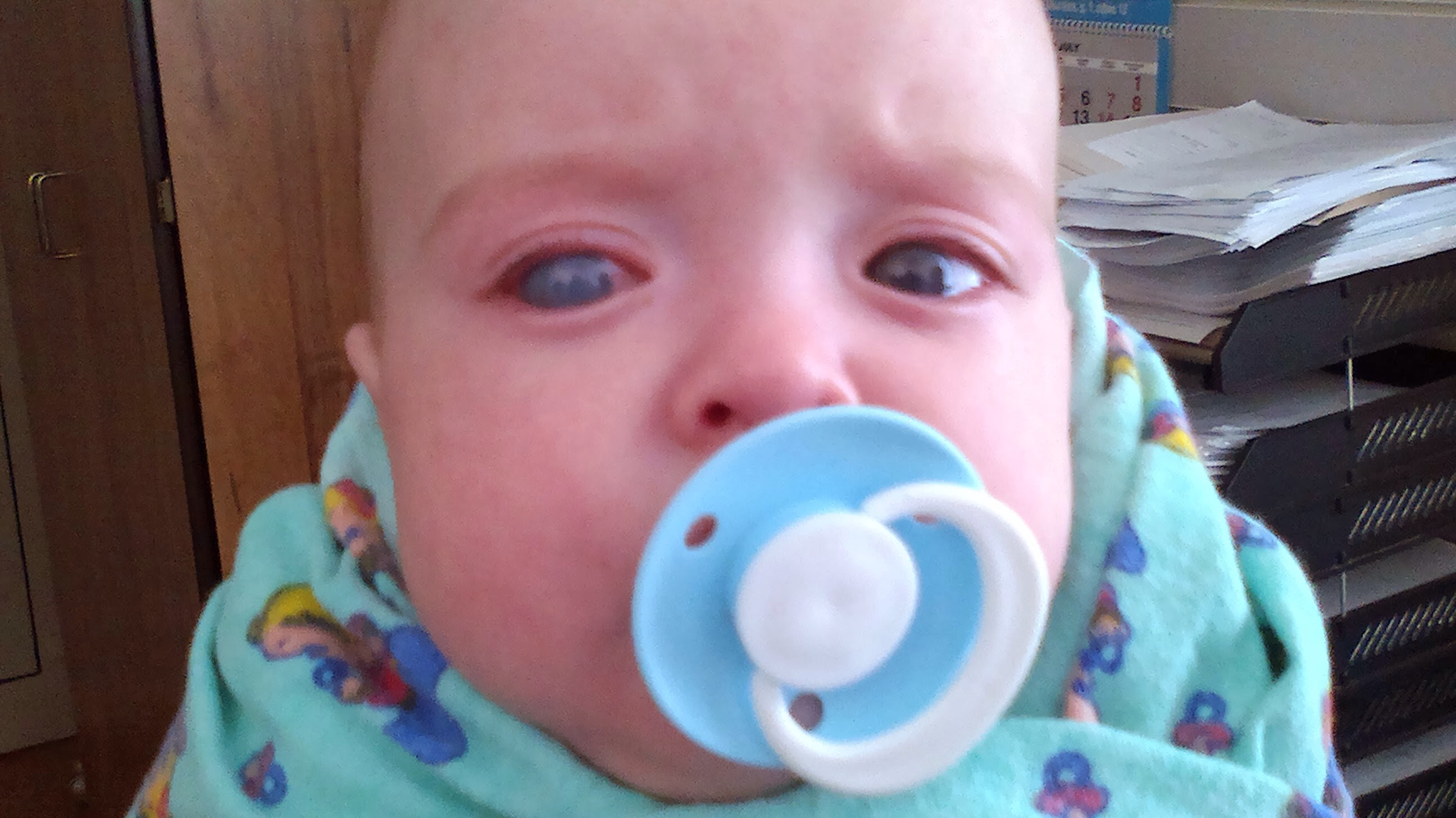
A child with right eye buphthalmos, developed due to congenital glaucoma

Buphthalmos in itself is merely a clinical sign and does not generate symptoms. Patients with glaucoma often initially have no symptoms; later, they can exhibit excessive tearing (lacrimation) and extreme sensitivity to light (photophobia). On ophthalmologic exam, a doctor can detect increased intraocular pressure, distortion of the optic disc, and corneal edema, which manifests as haziness.

Other symptoms include a prominent eyeball, Haab's striae tear in the Descemet's membrane of the cornea, an enlarged cornea, and myopia.

== Cause ==
Infantile glaucoma, which often produces the clinical sign of buphthalmos, can be caused when an abnormally narrow angle between the cornea and iris blocks the outflow of aqueous humor; this causes increased intraocular pressure and eventual enlargement of the globe (eyeball). Angle closure can be caused by developmental abnormalities of the eye as well as the presence of abnormal structures within the vitreous. Corneal diameter of greater than 11mm before the age of one year or corneal diameter greater than 13mm at any age are diagnostic criteria for buphthalmos.

== Treatment ==
Untreated glaucoma leads to total blindness. Surgical treatment is required. Presently-utilized surgical procedures include goniotomy, trabeculotomy, or trabeculectomy.

Goniotomy (ab interno) is done when the cornea is clear while in the case of a hazy or opaque cornea, trabeculotomy (ab externo) can be done. Some hyperosmotic agents such as glycerine can be applied over the cornea if cornea haziness is due to increase in intraocular pressure(with cornea epithelial/stromal edema). This is useful in enabling immediate visualization of the anterior chamber angle.

Trabeculotomy-trabeculectomy can also be done as a combined procedure or trabeculectomy alone when the other previously mentioned procedures are either contraindicated or fails.

== Etymology ==
The name of the condition derives from the Greek βοῦς bous (ox or cow), referring to the bulging eyes common to bovines.

== Society and culture ==
US musical legend Ray Charles, who was totally blind by age 7, had probably been afflicted with glaucoma and may have had buphthalmos early in life. The blindness of saxophonist Rahsaan Roland Kirk (1935–1977) is noted on his 1952 leaving report card from Ohio State School for the Blind as caused by bupthalmos.
