= Hypotony maculopathy =

Disease of the eye

- Specialty: Ophthalmology,
- Symptoms: blurry vision, vision loss
- Complications: Blindness
- Causes: Low intraocular pressure
- Diagnostic method: Eye examination

Hypotony maculopathy is maculopathy due to very low intraocular pressure known as ocular hypotony. Maculopathy occurs either due to increased outflow of aqueous humor through angle of anterior chamber or less commonly, due to decreased aqueous humor secretion by ciliary body.

== Presentation ==
Hypotony maculopathy is maculopathy due to ocular hypotony. Fundus examination may reveal abnormalities like chorioretinal folds, optic nerve head swelling (papilledema) and tortuosity of blood vessels.

== Causes ==
Maculopathy occurs either due to increased outflow of aqueous humor through angle of anterior chamber or less commonly, due to decreased aqueous humor secretion by ciliary body.

Chronic inflammation within the eye including iridocyclitis, medications including anti glaucoma drugs, or proliferative vitreoretinopathy causes decreased production. Increased outflow or aqueous loss may occur following a glaucoma surgery, trauma, post-surgical wound leak from the eye, cyclodialysis cleft, tractional ciliary body detachment or retinal detachment. Use of anti fibrosis drugs like mitomycin C during glaucoma surgery will increase the risk of hypotony maculopathy development.

== Diagnosis ==
Many ophthalmic imaging techniques are used in detecting hypotony maculopathy. Indocyanine green angiography or fluorescein angiography can help in early detection of choroidal disturbances and choroidal folds. Medical ultrasound may be used to detect scleral and choroidal thickening, anterior chamber depth, ciliary detachment and cyclodialysis cleft. OCT scanning can be used in detecting abnormalities of retina and choroid.

== Treatment ==
To prevent retinal dysfunction and vision loss, intraocular pressure should be normalised by treating the cause of hypotony. Delay in treatment results in permanent chorioretinal changes and permanent loss of vision.

== History ==
Dellaporta first described the condition in 1954. Gass, in 1972, named it hypotony maculopathy.
