= Ciliary =

Ciliary may refer to:

- Cilium – projections from living cells that have locomotive or sensory functions
- Ciliary body - the circumferential tissue inside the eye
- Ciliary muscle - eye muscle used for focusing
- Ciliary nerves (disambiguation)
- Ciliary processes - folded layers in the anterior of the eye
- Latin for Eyelash
