= Maculopathy =

Term for pathological conditions effecting the macula

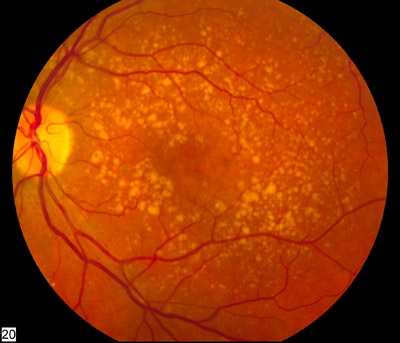
Fundoscopy demonstrating age-related macular degeneration.

A maculopathy is any pathological condition of the macula, an area at the centre of the retina that is associated with highly sensitive, accurate vision.

== Forms of maculopathies ==
- Age-related macular degeneration is a degenerative maculopathy associated with progressive sight loss. It is characterised by changes in pigmentation in the retinal pigment epithelium, the appearance of drusen on the retina of the eye and choroidal neovascularization. AMD has two forms: 'dry' or atrophic/non-exudative AMD, and 'wet' or exudative/neovascular AMD.
- Malattia leventinese (or Doyne's honeycomb retinal dystrophy) is another maculopathy with a similar pathology to wet AMD.
- Hypotony maculopathy: Maculopathy due to very low intraocular pressure (ocular hypotony).
- Cellophane maculopathy: A fine glistening membrane forms over the macula, obscuring the vision.

== See also ==
- EFEMP1 - a gene thought to be involved with Malattia Leventinese
- Robert Walter Doyne - the British Ophthalmologist after whom Malattia Leventinese is named
- Age-Related Macular Degeneration
- Retinitis Pigmentosa
- Malattia Leventinese
