= Cyclodestruction =

Surgical procedure to reduce intraocular pressure of the eye

Cyclodestruction or cycloablation is a surgical procedure done in management of glaucoma. Cyclodestruction reduces intraocular pressure (IOP) of the eye by decreasing production of aqueous humor by the destruction of ciliary body. Until the development of safer and less destructive techniques like micropulse diode cyclophotocoagulation and endocyclophotocoagulation, cyclodestructive surgeries were mainly done in refractory glaucoma, or advanced glaucomatous eyes with poor visual prognosis.

== Types ==
Cyclodestruction may be done by using diathermy, penetrating cyclodiathermy, cryotherapy, ultrasound, laser or by surgical excision.

=== Cyclophotocoagulation ===
Cyclophotocoagulation (CPC), the most common cyclodestructive procedure is done using laser beam of different wavelengths. Ruby laser (693 nm wavelength), Nd:YAG laser (1064 nm wavelength) or diode laser (810 nm wavelength) can be used to perform CPC. Commomon cyclophotocoagulation techniques include transscleral cyclophotocoagulation (TS-CPC), continuous-wave diode cyclophotocoagulation (CW-TSCPC), MicroPulse diode cyclophotocoagulation (MP-TSCPC), endocyclophotocoagulation (ECP) and high-intensity focused ultrasound cyclodestruction (HIFU). Complications are lesser with Trans-scleral diode laser cyclophotocoagulation and Endoscopic diode laser cyclophotocoagulation.

==== Transscleral cyclophotocoagulation ====
Diode laser with a wavelength of 810 nm is used to perform trans-scleral cyclophotocoagulation. In TS-CPC, the laser absorbed by melanin of ciliary processes causes photocoagulation. Since it is a painful procedure, TS-CPC is usually performed under retrobulbar or peribulbar anesthesia. Micropulse transscleral diode cyclophotocoagulation (MP-TSCPC), a modified TS-CPC procedure is a more safer procedure.

==== Endocyclophotocoagulation ====
Endocyclophotocoagulation (ECP) or endoscopic cyclophotocoagulation using an endoscope allows direct view of the ciliary processes during surgery. Compared to TS-CPC, tissue disruption is lesser with ECP.

=== Cyclocryotherapy ===
Cyclocryotherapy is done by freezing the ciliary processes of the eye. In neovascular glaucoma, cyclocryotherapy is advised when medical control of IOP is not possible.

== Complications ==
Inflammation, retinal detachment, hypotony, phthisis bulbi and sympathetic ophthalmia are some common complications of cyclodestructive procedures. Since there is risk of inflammation which lead to hypotony and phthisis bulbi, cyclophotocoagulation must be done with extreme caution in uveitic glaucoma. Pain, hyphema and iridocyclitis are possible complications of TS-CPC. Fibrin exudates, hyphema, cystoid macular edema and loss of vision are possible complications of ECP.

== History ==
The first surgical procedures to reduce intraocular pressure of the eye, by decreasing production of aqueous humor, by damaging the ciliary body by diathermy, penetrating cyclodiathermy or surgical excision was done in the early twentieth century. Cyclodestruction by diathermy was first performed by Weve in 1933. In 1949, Berens et al. described cyclo-electrolysis. Cyclocryotherapy was first described by Bietti in 1950. Cyclodestruction by cyclophotocoagulation was first performed by Beckman et al., in 1972, using a ruby laser. ECP was developed by Martin Uram in 1992.
