= Otto Haab =

Swiss ophthalmologist (1850–1931)

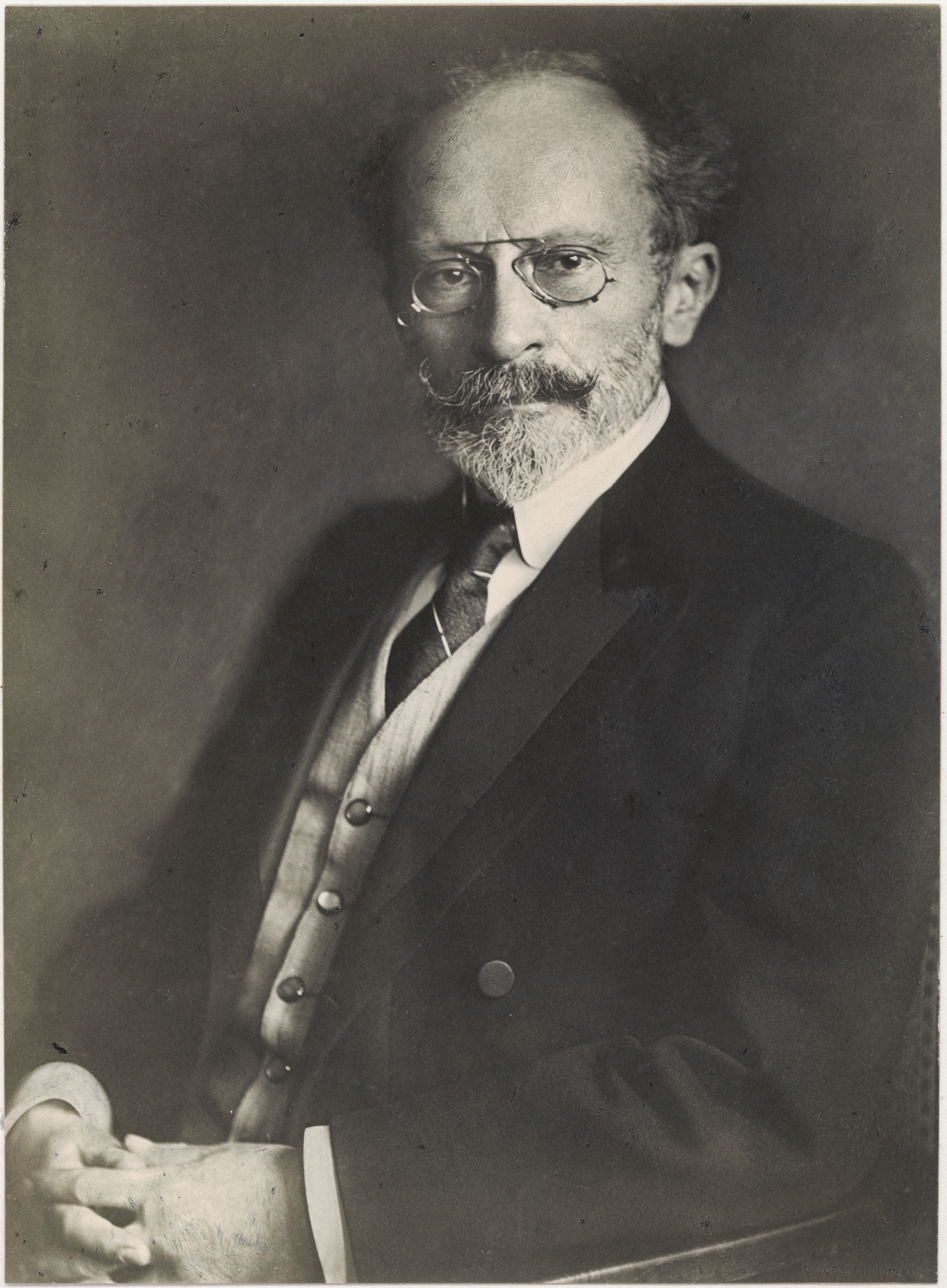
Otto Haab, 1914

Otto Haab (19 April 1850 – 17 October 1931) was a Swiss ophthalmologist who was a native of Wülflingen, which today is a district in the city of Winterthur.

In 1875, he obtained his doctorate from the University of Zurich, where, as a student, he was an assistant to Karl Joseph Eberth in pathological anatomy. In 1886, he succeeded Johann Friedrich Horner as professor of ophthalmology at Zurich, a position he held until 1919.

Otto Haab made contributions involving pathological anatomy of the eye, as well as in treatment of eye-related lesions. In 1885 he clinically described what he called senile macular disease, today known as senile or age-related macular degeneration (AMD), and investigated the atrophic and pigmentary changes in the macular region of the eye associated with the condition.

His name is associated with several medical eponyms, that include: "Haab's reflex", which is another name for pupillary light reflex, and "Haab's magnet", a powerful magnet used for removing metallic particles from the eye. Also, the "Haab scale" is a device used to measure pupillary diameter, and "Haab's striae" are horizontal breaks in the Descemet membrane associated with congenital glaucoma.

== Selected publications ==
- Atlas und Grundriss der Ophthalmoskopie und ophthalmoskopischen Diagnostik Munich, 1895. (5th edition, 1908; translated into English and French).
- Atlas der äusseren Erkrankugen des Auges nebst Grundriss ihrer Pathologie und Therapie Munich, 1899. (4th edition, 1910; translated into English and French).
- Atlas und Grundriss der Lehre von den Augenoperationen Munich, 1904. (2nd edition, 1920; translated into English and French).
