= Peter Watson (ophthalmologist) =

British ophthalmologist

Peter Gordon Watson
- Born: 30 April 1930; Newport, Wales, United Kingdom
- Died: 31 January 2017 (aged 86)
- Citizenship: British
- Known for: trabeculectomy
- Awards: APAO Jose Rizal International Medal; International Duke Elder Medal; Jules François Golden Medal; Jules Francois International Research Gold Medal
- Scientific career
- Fields: ophthalmology
- Workplaces: Addenbrooke's Hospital, Cambridge and Moorfields Eye Hospital, London

Peter Gordon Watson (30 April 1930 – 31 January 2017) was a British ophthalmologist, professor and researcher better known as the inventor of surgical procedure trabeculectomy. With John Cairns, in the 1970s, Watson developed trabeculectomy, the most common form of surgery for glaucoma today. His 1977 textbook, The Sclera and Systemic Disorders (third edition published in 2012) is still considered the only comprehensive textbook on disease of the sclera.

== Biography ==
Peter Gordon Watson was born on April 30, 1930, in Newport, Wales, United Kingdom, the son of Ralph and Renée née Smith. He studied and trained in ophthalmology at University College Hospital, London, Moorfields Eye Hospital, London and the Institute of Ophthalmology.

Watson held several positions including president of the Academia Ophthalmology Internationalis, member of the International Council of Ophthalmology, Editor of Eye magazine, Founder and Chair of the Cambridge Eye Trust, and Deputy Hospitaller for the Order of St John of Jerusalem.

=== Personal life and death ===
Watson and his wife Ann have five children. He died on January 31, 2017, at the age of 86, due to prostate cancer.

== Contributions ==
With John Cairns, in the 1970s, Watson developed trabeculectomy, the most common form of surgery for glaucoma today. Watson's other contributions include research into the mechanisms of diseases affecting sclera and mechanisms for corneal graft rejection. He has authored or co-authored seven books, 18 chapters and 168 scientific papers. His 1977 textbook, The Sclera and Systemic Disorders (third edition published in 2012) is still considered the only comprehensive textbook on disease of the sclera.

Peter Watson ran the scleritis clinic at Addenbrooke's Hospital in Cambridge and Moorfields Eye Hospital in London.

== Awards and honors ==
- APAO Jose Rizal International Medal 2012
- International Council of Ophthalmology's International Duke Elder Medal 2002
- International Council of Ophthalmology's Jules François Golden Medal 2014
- International Council of Ophthalmology's Jules Francois International Research Gold Medal
- Moorfields Association lifetime achievement award
- In his honor, International Council of Ophthalmology initiated the Peter Watson Award in 2010
- Peter Watson International Scholarship is named after him
- Peter Watson Memorial Lecture was started in honor of him
