= Haab's striae =

Medical condition

Haab's striae, or Descemet's tears, are horizontal breaks in the Descemet membrane associated with congenital glaucoma. It is named after Otto Haab. These occur because descemet's membrane is less elastic than the corneal stroma. Tears are usually peripheral, concentric with limbus and appear as line with double contour.
