= Ocular hypotony =

Abnormally low intraocular pressure

Ocular hypotony, or ocular hypotension, or shortly hypotony, is the medical condition in which intraocular pressure (IOP) of the eye is very low.

== Types ==
Ocular hypotony is divided into statistical and clinical types. If intraocular pressure is low (less than 6.5 mm Hg) it is called statistical hypotony, and if the reduced IOP causes a decrease in vision, it is called clinical.

== Presentation ==
=== Complications ===
Decreased IOP may lead to phthisis bulbi. Hypotony maculopathy is another complication caused by very low IOP.

== Causes ==
Hypotony may occur either due to decreased production of aqueous humor or due to increased outflow. Hypotony has many causes including post-surgical wound leak from the eye, chronic inflammation within the eye including iridocyclitis, hypoperfusion, tractional ciliary body detachment or retinal detachment. Eye inflammation, medications including anti glaucoma drugs, or proliferative vitreoretinopathy causes decreased production. Increased outflow or aqueous loss may occur following a glaucoma surgery, trauma, cyclodialysis cleft or retinal detachment.

== Diagnosis ==
Normal IOP ranges between 10–20 mm Hg. The eye is considered hypotonous if the IOP is ≤5 mm Hg (some sources say IOP less than 6.5 mmHg).

== Treatment ==
Treatment of hypotony is depending on the cause of the condition. Chronic ocular hypotony may be treated with intraocular injection of sodium hyaluronate. If the cause of hypotony is an over filtering bleb, cycloplegia using atropine may be used.
