= Retrobulbar block =

Regional anesthetic nerve block in the area located behind the globe of the eye

- Specialty: Ophthalmology, anesthesiology

A retrobulbar block is a regional anesthetic nerve block in the retrobulbar space, which is the area located behind the globe of the eye. Injection of local anesthetic into this space constitutes the retrobulbar block. This injection provides akinesia of the extraocular muscles by blocking cranial nerves II, III, and VI, thereby preventing movement of the globe. Cranial nerve IV lies outside the muscle cone, and therefore is not affected by the local anesthesia. As a result, intorsion of the eye is still possible. It also provides sensory anesthesia of the conjunctiva, cornea and uvea by blocking the ciliary nerves. This block is most commonly employed for cataract surgery, but also provides anesthesia for other intraocular surgeries.

== Side effects and complications ==
Complications associated with this block are either ocular or systemic. Local ocular complications include hematoma formation, optic nerve damage and perforation of the globe with possible blindness. Systemic complications include local anesthetic toxicity, brainstem anesthesia, and stimulation of the oculocardiac reflex. Most commonly, patients will report discomfort during the performance of the block, such as the sensation of the needle during insertion and/or pressure behind the eye during injection. In recent years, peribulbar block has become increasingly used because of its lower incidence of complications.

== Technique ==
Resuscitative equipment, monitoring and personnel must be immediately available prior to performance of this block. The retrobulbar block is performed with the patient either seated or supine and looking straight ahead. The head should be maintained in a neutral position. A needle (22–27 Gauge, 3 cm long) is inserted at the inferolateral border of the bony orbit and directed straight back until it has passed the equator of the globe. It is then directed medially and cephalad toward the apex of the orbit. Occasionally a 'pop' is felt as the needle tip passes through the muscle cone delineating the retrobulbar space. Following a negative aspiration for blood, 2–4 mLs of local anesthetic solution is injected and the needle is withdrawn. 2% Lidocaine (Xylocaine) and 0.5% to 0.75% bupivicaine (Marcaine) are two commonly used agents. Epinephrine, commonly mixed in with local anesthetics for vasoconstriction, is not used in seeing eyes as this can cause a central retinal artery occlusion. An enzyme, hyaluronidase, is frequently a component of the anaesthetic solution, as it accelerates and improves dispersal of the agent. Akinesia and anesthesia quickly ensue within minutes with a successful retrobulbar injection. Retrobulbar block can be used successfully for corneal transplantation but may require a supplemental facial nerve block. Retrobulbar block can block levator palpebrae muscle but not orbicularis oculi. Several techniques for facial nerve block can be used in conjunction with retrobulbar block.

== See also ==
- Eye surgery
