= Ciliary nerves =

Ciliary nerves may refer to:

- Short ciliary nerves
- Long ciliary nerves
