= Primary congenital glaucoma =

- Other names: "trabeculodysgenesis", "goniodysgenesis". "childhood glaucoma"
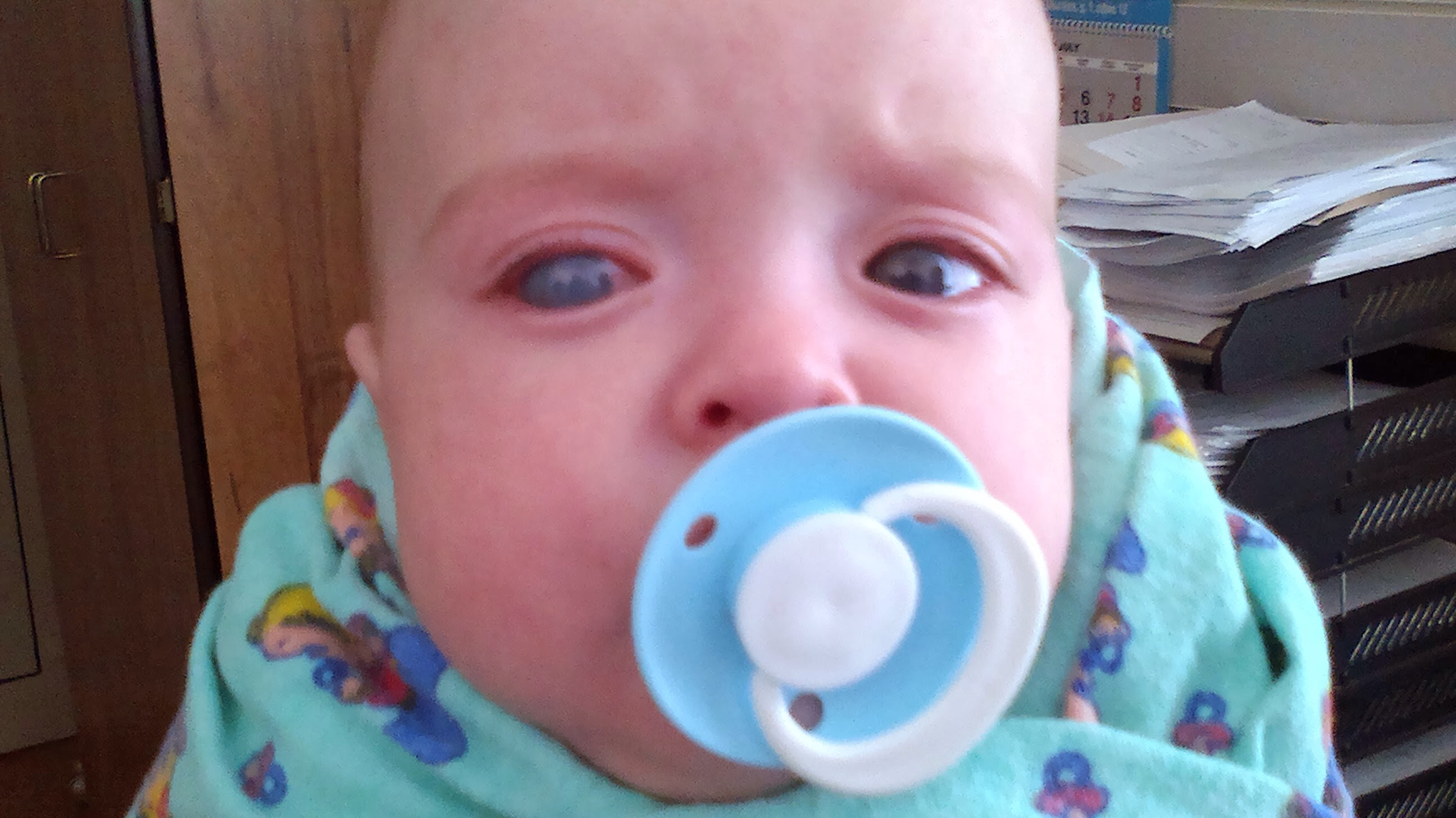
- A child with right eye buphthalmos, developed due to congenital glaucoma.
- Specialty: Ophthalmology
- Symptoms: Buphthalmos. Photophobia, Epiphora
- Causes: Developmental anomalies in the eye's drainage system
- Treatment: Goniotomy, trabeculotomy

Primary congenital glaucoma is a rare eye condition that is present at birth or develops early in childhood. It occurs due to improper drainage of the eye's fluids, which leads to increased pressure inside the eye, known as intraocular pressure. This elevated pressure can damage the optic nerve which will result in permanent vision loss. It is also known as pediatric glaucoma or childhood glaucoma, and was previously known as trabeculodysgenesis or goniodysgenesis.

== Types ==
Primary congenital glaucoma is classified into three subtypes:

- true congenital glaucoma, which causes signs of increased intraocular pressure within the first month of life,
- infantile glaucoma, which presents between one month and three years, and
- juvenile glaucoma, which becomes clinically apparent after three years of age and before age 40.

=== Primary juvenile glaucoma ===
Primary juvenile glaucoma becomes apparent between the ages of 3 and 40. It develops due to ocular hypertension and is diagnosed between three years of age and early adulthood. It is caused due to abnormalities in the anterior chamber angle development that obstruct aqueous outflow in the absence of systemic anomalies or other ocular malformation.

== Presentation ==
The typical infant who has congenital glaucoma usually is initially referred to an ophthalmologist because of apparent corneal edema. The commonly described triad of epiphora (excessive tearing), blepharospasm and photophobia may be missed until the corneal edema becomes apparent.

=== Systemic associations ===
Two of the more commonly encountered disorders that may be associated with congenital glaucoma are Aniridia and Sturge–Weber syndrome.

== Causes ==
The condition is often caused by developmental anomalies in the eye's drainage system. Genetic factors play a significant role, with several mutations identified like thrombospondin-1 that contribute to the development of congenital glaucoma. Common symptoms of primary congenital glaucoma include.

- Enlarged eyes (Buphthalmos)
- Sensitivity to light (Photophobia)
- Tearing (Epiphora)
- Cloudy cornea
- Bluish discoloration of the eyeball.

== Genetics ==
Primary congenital glaucomas most commonly occur sporadically. Juvenile open-angle glaucoma is typically an autosomal dominant, inherited condition. A primary cause is myocilin protein dysfunction. Myocilin gene mutations are identified in approximately 10% of patients affected by juvenile glaucoma.

== Diagnosis ==
The diagnosis is clinical. The intraocular pressure (IOP) can be measured in the office in a conscious swaddled infant using a Tonopen or hand-held Goldmann tonometer. Usually, the IOP in normal infants is in the range of 11-14 mmHg. Buphthalmos and Haab's striae can often be seen in case of congenital glaucoma.

Its diagnosis process typically involves an eye examination, including measurement of intraocular pressure, corneal diameter, and optic nerve assessment. Goniotomy is one surgical option, where surgeons cut into the eye's drainage angle to access the trabecular meshwork, using a gonioscope for visibility. If the drainage angle isn't clearly visible through the cornea, a trabeculotomy is performed, cutting into the sclera with an electrocautery device called a trabeculotome. If these approaches are ineffective, a trabeculectomy may be considered, removing part of the trabecular meshwork through the sclera to create a new drainage pathway. Alternatively, a glaucoma drainage device (tube shunt) may be implanted to drain fluids onto a plate beneath the conjunctiva. Early detection of this medical condition is important for prevention of vision loss.

=== Differential diagnosis ===
Corneal cloudiness may have myriad of causes. Corneal opacity that results from hereditary dystrophies is usually symmetric. Corneal enlargement may result from megalocornea, a condition in which the diameter of the cornea is larger than usual and the eye is otherwise normal.

== Treatment ==
The preferred treatment of congenital glaucoma is surgical, not medical. The initial procedures of choice are goniotomy or trabeculotomy if the cornea is clear, and trabeculectomy ab externo if the cornea is hazy. The success rates are similar for both procedures in patients with clear corneas. Trabeculectomy and shunt procedures should be reserved for those cases in which goniotomy or trabeculotomy has failed. Cyclophotocoagulation is necessary in some intractable cases but should be avoided whenever possible because of its potential adverse effects on the lens and the retina.

== Epidemiology ==
In the United States, the incidence of primary congenital glaucoma is about one in 10,000 live births. Worldwide, the incidence ranges from a low of 1:22,000 in Northern Ireland to a high of 1:2,500 in Saudi Arabia and 1:1,250 in Romania. In about two-thirds of cases, it is bilateral. The distribution between males and females varies with geography. In North America and Europe, it is more common in boys, whereas in Japan it is more common in girls.

- Incidence: one in every 10000-15000 live births.
- Bilateral in up to 80% of cases.
- Most cases are sporadic (90%). However, in the remaining 10% there appears to be a strong familial component.

It is common among Romani people.

== History ==
In the late 19th and early 20th centuries, the disease was commonly referred to by terms such as trabeculodysgenesis and goniodysgenesis, emphasizing the developmental anomalies in the eye's drainage structures. It was considered untreatable at the time, with most cases resulting in inevitable vision loss and blindness due to elevated intraocular pressure. In the early 20th century, Dr. Paul Chandler identified congenital glaucoma as a distinct medical condition. Later, Dr. Janey Wiggs, a researcher at Harvard Medical School, conducted studies identifying new genetic mutations associated with congenital glaucoma, such as the thrombospondin-1 (THBS1) gene.

== See also ==
- Axenfeld syndrome
- Peters-plus syndrome
- Weill–Marchesani syndrome
