= Ciliary body =

Part of the eye

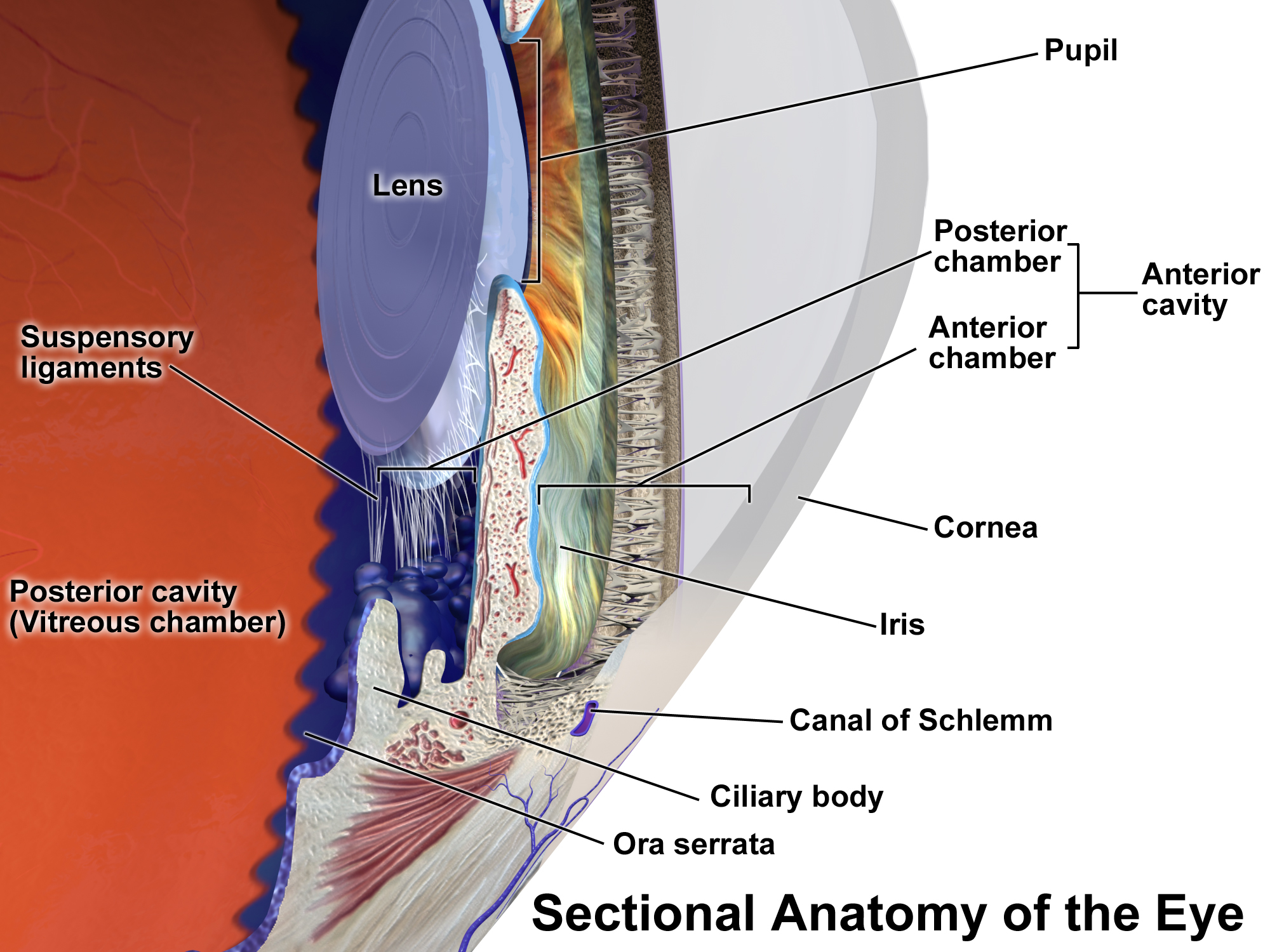
- Anterior part of the human eye, with ciliary body near bottom.

Details
- Part of: Eye
- System: Visual system
- Artery: long and short posterior ciliary arteries

Identifiers
- Latin: corpus ciliare
- MeSH: D002924
- TA98: A15.2.03.009
- TA2: 6765
- FMA: 58295

The ciliary body is a part of the eye that includes the ciliary muscle, which controls the shape of the lens, and the ciliary epithelium, which produces the aqueous humor. The aqueous humor is produced in the non-pigmented portion of the ciliary body. The ciliary body is part of the uvea, the layer of tissue that delivers oxygen and nutrients to the eye tissues. The ciliary body joins the ora serrata of the choroid to the root of the iris.

== Structure ==
The ciliary body is a ring-shaped thickening of tissue inside the eye that divides the posterior chamber from the vitreous body. It contains the ciliary muscle, vessels, and fibrous connective tissue. Folds on the inner ciliary epithelium are called ciliary processes, and these secrete aqueous humor into the posterior chamber. The aqueous humor then flows through the iris into the anterior chamber.

The ciliary body is attached to the lens by connective tissue called the Zonule of Zinn (fibers of Zinn). Relaxation of the ciliary muscle puts tension on these fibers and changes the shape of the lens in order to focus light on the retina.

The inner layer is transparent and covers the vitreous body, and is continuous from the neural tissue of the retina. The outer layer is highly pigmented, continuous with the retinal pigment epithelium, and constitutes the cells of the dilator muscle. This double membrane is often considered continuous with the retina and a rudiment of the embryological correspondent to the retina. The inner layer is unpigmented until it reaches the iris, where it takes on pigment. The retina ends at the ora serrata.

The space between the ciliary body and the base of the iris is the ciliary sulcus.

=== Nerve supply ===
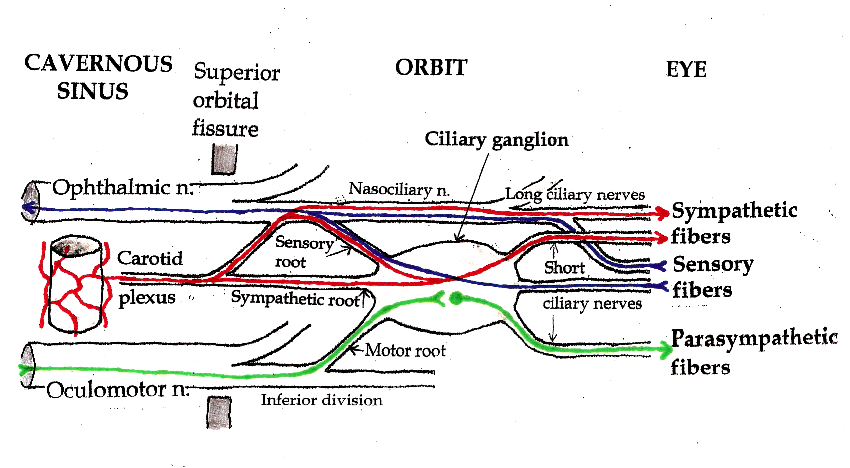
Ciliary ganglion with parasympathetic fibers of ciliary nerves.

The parasympathetic innervation of the ciliary body is the most clearly understood. Presynaptic parasympathetic signals that originate in the Edinger–Westphal nucleus are carried by cranial nerve III (the oculomotor nerve) and travel through the ciliary ganglion. Postsynaptic fibers from the ciliary ganglion form the short ciliary nerves. Parasympathetic activation of the M3 muscarinic receptors causes ciliary muscle contraction, the effect of contraction is to decrease the diameter of the ring of ciliary muscle. The parasympathetic tone is dominant when a higher degree of accommodation of the lens is required, such as reading a book.

The ciliary body is also known to receive sympathetic innervation via long ciliary nerves. When test subjects are startled, their eyes automatically adjust for distance vision.

== Function ==
The ciliary body has three functions: accommodation, aqueous humor production, and resorption, and maintenance of the lens zonules for the purpose of anchoring the lens in place.

=== Accommodation ===
Accommodation essentially means that when the ciliary muscle contracts, the lens becomes more convex, generally improving the focus for closer objects. When it relaxes, it flattens the lens, generally improving the focus for farther objects.

=== Aqueous humor ===
The ciliary epithelium of the ciliary processes produces aqueous humor, which is responsible for providing oxygen, nutrients, and metabolic waste removal to the lens and the cornea, which do not have their own blood supply. Approximately 80% of aqueous humor production is carried out through active secretion mechanisms (the Na+K+ATPase enzyme creating an osmotic gradient for the passage of water into the posterior chamber) and twenty percent is produced through the ultrafiltration of plasma. Intraocular pressure affects the rate of ultrafiltration, but not secretion.

=== Lens zonules ===
The zonular fibers collectively make up the suspensory ligament of the lens. These provide strong attachments between the ciliary muscle and the capsule of the lens.

== Clinical significance ==
Glaucoma is a group of ocular disorders characterized by high intraocular pressure-associated neuropathies. Intraocular pressure depends on the levels of production and resorption of aqueous humor. Because the ciliary body produces aqueous humor, it is the main target of many medications against glaucoma. Its inhibition leads to the lowering of aqueous humor production and causes a subsequent drop in the intraocular pressure. There are three main types of medication affecting the ciliary body:

- Beta blockers, the second most common treatment method for glaucoma, reduce the production of aqueous humor. They are relatively inexpensive and are available in generic form. Timolol, Levobunolol, and Betaxolol are common beta blockers prescribed to treat glaucoma.
- Alpha-adrenergic agonists work by decreasing production of fluid and increasing drainage. Brimonidine and Apraclonidine are two commonly prescribes alpha agonists for glaucoma treatment. Alphagan P uses a purite preservative, which is better tolerated by those who have allergic reactions than the older BAK preservative in other eye drops. Furthermore, less selective alpha agonists such as epinephrine may decrease the production of aqueous humor through vasoconstriction of the ciliary body (only for open-angle glaucoma).
- Carbonic anhydrase inhibitors also decrease fluid production. They are available as eye drops (Trusopt and Azopt) and pills (Diamox and Neptazane). This may be helpful if using more than one type of eye medication.

== See also ==
- Intraocular pressure
- Iridodialysis
- Glaucoma
- Cyclodestruction
