= Aqueous humour =

Fluid in the anterior segment of the eye

- Schematic diagram of the human eye.

Details

Identifiers
- Latin: humor aquosus
- MeSH: D001082
- TA98: A15.2.06.002
- TA2: 6791
- FMA: 58819

The aqueous humour is a transparent water-like fluid similar to blood plasma, but containing low protein concentrations. It is secreted from the ciliary body, a structure supporting the lens of the eyeball. It fills both the anterior and the posterior chambers of the eye, and is not to be confused with the vitreous humour, which is located in the space between the lens and the retina, also known as the posterior cavity or vitreous chamber. Blood cannot normally enter the eyeball.

== Structure ==
=== Composition ===
- Amino acids: transported by ciliary muscles
- 98% water
- Electrolytes (pH = 7.4 -one source gives 7.1)
  - Sodium = 142.09
  - Potassium = 2.2 - 4.0
  - Calcium = 1.8
  - Magnesium = 1.1
  - Chloride = 131.6
  - HCO_{3}^{−} = 20.15
  - Phosphate = 0.62
  - OSM = 304
- Ascorbic acid
- Glutathione
- Immunoglobulins

== Function ==
- Maintains the intraocular pressure and inflates the globe of the eye. It is this hydrostatic pressure that keeps the eyeball in a roughly spherical shape and keeps the walls of the eyeball taut.
- Provides nutrition (e.g. amino acids and glucose) for the avascular ocular tissues; posterior cornea, trabecular meshwork, lens, and anterior vitreous.
- May serve to transport ascorbate in the anterior segment to act as an antioxidant agent.
- Presence of immunoglobulins indicates a role in immune response to defend against pathogens.
- Provides inflation for expansion of the cornea and thus increased protection against dust, wind, pollen grains, and some pathogens.
- Contributes refraction, with a refractive index of 1.3335
- Prevents eye dryness.

=== Production ===
Aqueous humour is secreted into the posterior chamber by the ciliary body, specifically the non-pigmented epithelium of the ciliary body (pars plicata). 5 alpha-dihydrocortisol, an enzyme inhibited by 5-alpha reductase inhibitors, may be involved in production of aqueous humour.

=== Drainage ===
Aqueous humor is continually produced by the ciliary processes and this rate of production must be balanced by an equal rate of aqueous humor drainage. Small variations in the production or outflow of aqueous humor will have a large influence on the intraocular pressure.

The drainage route for aqueous humor flow is first through the posterior chamber, then the narrow space between the posterior iris and the anterior lens (contributes to small resistance), through the pupil to enter the anterior chamber. From there, the aqueous humor exits the eye through the trabecular meshwork into Schlemm's canal (a channel at the limbus, i.e., the joining point of the cornea and sclera, which encircles the cornea). It flows through 25–30 collector canals into the episcleral veins. The greatest resistance to aqueous flow is provided by the trabecular meshwork (esp. the juxtacanalicular part), and this is where most of the aqueous outflow occurs. The internal wall of the canal is very delicate and allows the fluid to filter due to the high pressure of the fluid within the eye. The secondary route is the uveoscleral drainage, and is independent of the intraocular pressure, the aqueous flows through here, but to a lesser extent than through the trabecular meshwork (approx. 10% of the total drainage whereas by trabecular meshwork 90% of the total drainage).

The fluid is normally 15 mmHg (0.6 inHg) above atmospheric pressure, so when a syringe is injected the fluid flows easily. If the fluid is leaking, the hardness of the normal eye is compromised, leading to collapse and wilting of the cornea.

== Clinical significance ==
Glaucoma is a progressive optic neuropathy where retinal ganglion cells and their axons die causing a corresponding visual field defect. An important risk factor is increased intraocular pressure (pressure within the eye) either through increased production or decreased outflow of aqueous humour. Increased resistance to outflow of aqueous humour may occur due to an abnormal trabecular meshwork or due to obliteration of the meshwork resulting from injury or disease of the iris. However, increased interocular pressure is neither sufficient nor necessary for development of primary open angle glaucoma, although it is a major risk factor. Uncontrolled glaucoma typically leads to visual field loss and ultimately blindness.

Uveoscleral outflow of aqueous humour can be increased with prostaglandin agonists, while trabecular outflow is increased by M3 agonists. Fluid production can be decreased by beta blockers, alpha2-agonists, and carbonic anhydrase inhibitors.

== Additional images ==
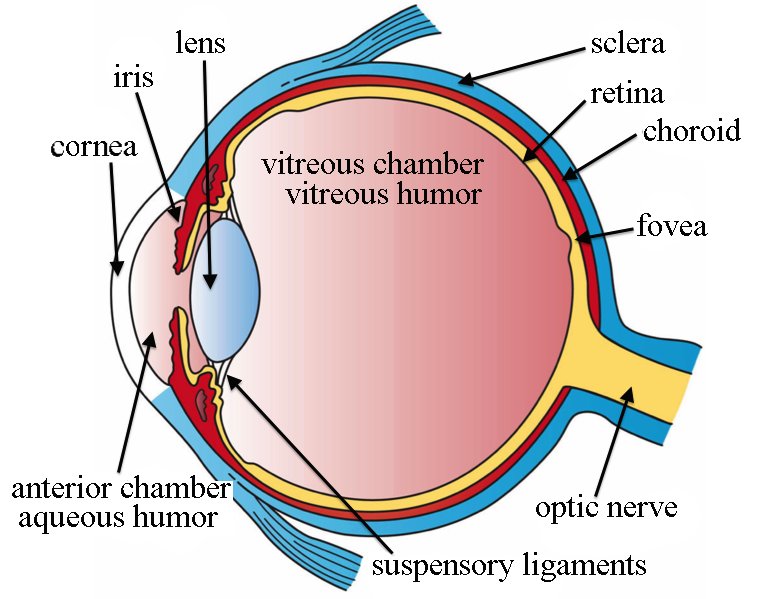
Structures of the eye labeled

Another labeled view of the structures of the eye

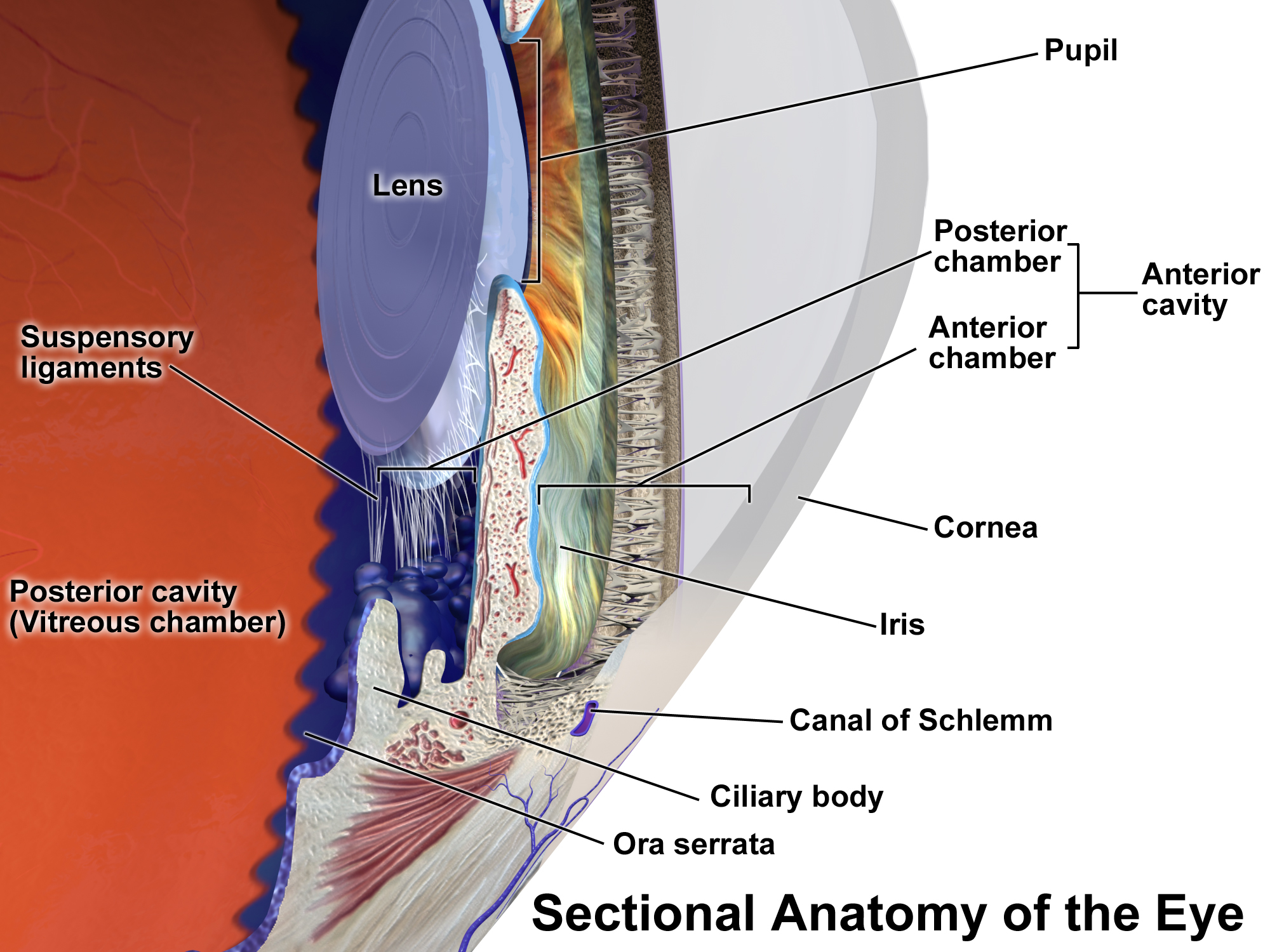
Sectional Anatomy of the Eye in greater detail, showing Anterior and Posterior Chambers in Anterior Cavity, and Posterior Cavity; also Canal of Schlemm, Ciliary body, and Ora serrata

== See also ==
- Vitreous Humour
- Eye ball
