= Illusory palinopsia =

Subtype of palinopsia

- Palinopsia simulation
- Specialty: Ophthalmology

Illusory palinopsia is a subtype of palinopsia, a visual disturbance defined as the persistence or recurrence of a visual image after the stimulus has been removed. Palinopsia is a broad term describing a heterogeneous group of symptoms, which is divided into hallucinatory palinopsia and illusory palinopsia. Illusory palinopsia is likely due to sustained awareness of a stimulus and is similar to a visual illusion: the distorted perception of a real external stimulus.

Illusory palinopsia is caused by migraines, hallucinogen persisting perception disorder (HPPD), prescription drugs, and head trauma, but is also sometimes idiopathic. Illusory palinopsia consists of afterimages that are short-lived or unformed, occur at the same location in the visual field as the original stimulus, and are often exposed or exacerbated based on environmental parameters such as stimulus intensity, background contrast, fixation, and movement. Illusory palinopsia symptoms occur continuously or predictably, based on environmental conditions. The term is from Greek: palin for "again" and opsia for "seeing".

== Signs and symptoms ==
Illusory palinopsia is often worse with high stimulus intensity and contrast ratio in a dark adapted state. Multiple types of illusory palinopsia often co-exist in a patient and occur with other diffuse, persistent illusory symptoms such as halos around objects, dysmetropsia (micropsia, macropsia, pelopsia, or teleopsia), Alice in Wonderland syndrome, visual snow, and oscillopsia. Illusory palinopsia consists of the following four symptom categories.

=== Prolonged indistinct afterimage ===
Prolonged indistinct afterimages are unformed and occur at the same location in the visual field as the original stimulus. Stimulus intensity, contrast, and fixation length affects the generation and severity of these perseverated images. For example, after seeing a bright light such as a car headlight or a camera flash, a persistent afterimage remains in the visual field for several minutes. Patients often report photophobia, which can restrict their ability to perform outdoor activity. The prolonged image or light is typically isochromatic (positive afterimage) to the original stimulus, but can fade to different colors over time. Afterimages from lights tend to last longer than the indistinct afterimages from other brightly colored objects. Palinoptic prolonged light afterimages of the complementary color are differentiated from physiological afterimages based on afterimage intensity and duration.

=== Light streaking ===
Light streaking describes a comet-like tail which is seen due to motion between a person or a light. The streaking usually persists for several seconds before fading and often occurs with bright lights on a dark background. Patients commonly report of difficulty with night driving since the headlights of oncoming cars cause multiple streaks which obscure vision.

=== Visual trailing ===
Visual trailing describes an object in motion leaving frozen copies in its wake. These motion-induced afterimages may be discontinuous such as in a film reel or may be blurred together such as in a long-exposure photograph. If discontinuous, the patient also usually reports akinetopsia. The perseverated images last a few seconds and are usually identical in color and shape to the original stimulus. Most cases describe visual trails during movement of an object, although there are also reports from the movement of the observer's head or eyes.

=== Variant image perseveration ===
There are a few cases of palinopsia with many of the same features as hallucinatory palinopsia (formed image perseveration) but with some important differences. The formed perseverated image may only last a couple seconds or may be black or translucent. These variants usually lack the realistic clarity of hallucinatory palinopsia, and the generation of the palinoptic images is affected by fixation time, motion, stimulus intensity, or contrast. These variants probably represent an overlap in hallucinatory and illusory palinopsia but are included in illusory palinopsia since they often co-exist with the other illusory symptoms.

== Cause ==
Of the published cases of palinopsia that are idiopathic or attributed to migraines, HPPD, prescription drugs, or head trauma, 94% described illusory palinopsia. Trazodone, nefazodone, mirtazapine, topiramate, clomiphene, oral contraceptives, and risperidone have been reported to cause illusory palinopsia. Clomiphene and oral contraceptives are the only prescription drugs reported to cause permanent symptoms. HPPD is most common after LSD ingestion, but can occur after any hallucinogen use. HPPD is commonly described in psychiatric literature and illusory palinopsia symptoms are sometimes not defined as palinopsia. It is not clear if there is a relationship between HPPD and the quantity and strength of hallucinogen doses taken.

== Pathophysiology ==
Illusory palinopsia is a dysfunction in visual perception, presumably related to diffuse neuronal excitability alterations in the anterior and posterior visual pathways. Because of the drugs that cause illusory palinopsia, 5-HT2a receptor excitotoxicity or a disruption of GABAergic transmission have been proposed as possible mechanisms. However, the neuropharmacology of the visual system is probably too complex to pinpoint the visual disturbances to a single neurotransmitter or neurotransmitter receptor. The generation of illusory palinopsia is often dependent on ambient light or motion, and the symptoms could be a pathological exaggeration of normal light perception and motion perception mechanisms. Prolonged indistinct afterimages are symptomatically similar to physiological afterimages, and light streaking and visual trailing are symptomatically similar to motion blur when viewing fast-moving objects.

Light and motion perception are dynamic operations involving processing and feedback from structures throughout the central nervous system. A patient frequently has multiple types of diffuse, persistent illusory symptoms which represent dysfunctions in both light and motion perception. Light and motion are processed via different pathways, which suggests that there are diffuse or global excitability alterations in the visual pathway. Faulty neural adaptation and feedback between the anterior and posterior visual pathways could cause persistent excitability changes. Movement-related palinopsia could be due to inappropriate or incomplete activation of the motion suppression mechanisms (visual masking/backward masking and corollary discharges) related to visual stability during eye or body movements, which are present in saccadic suppression, blinking, smooth pursuit, etc.

=== Palinopsia in migraineurs ===
Illusory palinopsia may occur during a migraine aura, as do other diffuse illusory symptoms such as halos around objects, visual snow, dysmetropsia, and oscillopsia. In a rare migraine subtype known as persistent visual aura without infarction, illusory palinopsia symptoms (prolonged indistinct afterimages, light streaking, and visual trailing) persist after the migraine has abated. Alternatively, up to 10% of all migraineurs report of formed afterimages that only last a couple seconds and do not occur with other illusory symptoms. These momentary afterimages appear at a different location in the visual field than the original stimulus, occur a few times per month, and are affected by external light and motion. (variant image perseveration). Migraineurs with these momentary afterimages report significantly fewer migraine headaches than migraineurs without these afterimages (4.3 vs. 14.4 attacks/year). These afterimages probably represent an overlap in hallucinatory and illusory palinopsia. Studying these momentary formed afterimages, in relation to alterations in cortical excitability, could advance our understanding of migraine pathogenesis and mechanisms associated with encoding visual memory.

== Diagnosis ==
Palinopsia necessitates a full ophthalmologic and neurologic history and physical exam. There are no clear guidelines on the work-up for illusory palinopsia, but it is not unreasonable to order automated visual field testing and neuroimaging since migraine aura can sometimes mimic seizures or cortical lesions. However, in a young patient without risk factors or other worrisome symptoms or signs (vasculopathy, history of cancer, etc.), neuroimaging for illusory palinopsia is low-yield but may grant the patient peace of mind.

The physical exam and work-up are usually non-contributory in illusory palinopsia. Diagnosing the etiology of illusory palinopsia is often based on the clinical history. Palinopsia is attributed to a prescription drug if symptoms begin after drug initiation or dose increase. Palinopsia is attributed to head trauma if symptoms begin shortly after the incident. Continuous illusory palinopsia in a migraineur is usually from persistent visual aura. HPPD can occur any time after hallucinogen ingestion and is a diagnosis of exclusion in patients with previous hallucinogen use. Migraines and HPPD are probably the most common causes of palinopsia. Idiopathic palinopsia may be analogous to the cerebral state in persistent visual aura with non-migraine headache or persistent visual aura without headache.

Due to the subjective nature of the symptoms and the lack of organic findings, clinicians may be dismissive of illusory palinopsia, sometimes causing the patient distress. There is considerable evidence in the literature confirming the symptom legitimacy, so validating the patient's symptoms can help ease anxiety. Unidirectional visual trails or illusory symptoms confined to part of a visual field suggest cortical pathology and necessitate further work-up.

== Treatment ==
There is limited data on treating the visual disturbances associated with HPPD, persistent visual aura, or post-head trauma visual disturbances, and pharmaceutical treatment is empirically based. It is not clear if the etiology or type of illusory symptom influences treatment efficacy. Since the symptoms are usually benign, treatment is based on the patient's zeal and willingness to try many different drugs. There are cases which report successful treatment with clonidine, clonazepam, lamotrigine, nimodipine, topiramate, verapamil, divalproex sodium, gabapentin, furosemide, and acetazolamide, as these drugs have mechanisms that decrease neuronal excitability. However, other patients report treatment failure from the same drugs. Based on the available evidence and side-effect profile, clonidine might be an attractive treatment option. Many patients report improvement from sunglasses. FL-41 tinted lenses may provide additional relief, as they have shown some efficacy in providing relief to visually-sensitive migraineurs.
