= Cerebral polyopia =

Seeing two or more images after fixation on a stimulus

Cerebral diplopia or polyopia describes seeing two or more images arranged in ordered rows, columns, or diagonals after fixation on a stimulus. The polyopic images occur monocular bilaterally (one eye open on both sides) and binocularly (both eyes open), differentiating it from ocular diplopia or polyopia. The number of duplicated images can range from one to hundreds. Some patients report difficulty in distinguishing the replicated images from the real images, while others report that the false images differ in size, intensity, or color. Cerebral polyopia is sometimes confused with palinopsia (visual trailing), in which multiple images appear while watching an object. However, in cerebral polyopia, the duplicated images are of a stationary object which are perceived even after the object is removed from the visual field. Movement of the original object causes all of the duplicated images to move, or the polyopic images disappear during motion. In palinoptic polyopia, movement causes each polyopic image to leave an image in its wake, creating hundreds of persistent images (entomopia).

Infarctions, tumors, multiple sclerosis, trauma, encephalitis, migraines, and seizures have been reported to cause cerebral polyopia. Cerebral polyopia has been reported in extrastriate visual cortex lesions, which is important for detecting motion, orientation, and direction. Cerebral polyopia often occurs in homonymous field deficits, suggesting deafferentation hyperexcitability could be a possible mechanism, similar to visual release hallucinations (Charles Bonnet syndrome).

== Presentation ==
Cerebral polyopia is most often associated with occipital or temporal lobe lesions, as well as occipital lobe epilepsy. This condition is relatively uncommon, thus further research regarding its causes and mechanism has not been performed. Polyopia can be experienced as partial second or multiple images to either side (or in any eccentricity) of an object at fixation. Polyopia occurs when both eyes are open, or when one eye is open, during fixation on a stimulus. Known cases of polyopia provide evidence that, in relation to the stimulus at fixation, multiple images can appear at a constant distance in any direction; gaps in portions of an object at fixation can exist; multiple images can be overlaid vertically, horizontally, or diagonally on top of the stimulus; and the multiple images can appear different sizes, alignments, and complexities. The complexity of the stimulus does not appear to affect the clarity of the multiple images. The physical distance of the stimulus from the patient (near or far) also does not seem to affect the presence of multiple images.^{[7]} However, if the stimulus is swung or moved, multiple images of that object can either be extinguished or transformed into different objects, depending on the severity of the condition.

The onset of polyopia is not immediate upon perception of visual stimuli; rather, it occurs within milliseconds to seconds of fixation upon a stimulus. Polyopia has been described by patients as images "suddenly multiplying." These multiple images can drift, fade, and disappear, depending on the severity of the condition. These episodes of polyopia can last from seconds to hours. In one specific case, a patient described difficulties reading due to letters "run[ning] together" and momentarily disappearing.

Most cases of polyopia are accompanied by another neurological condition. Polyopia is often accompanied by visual field defects (such as the presence of a scotoma) or transient visual hallucinations. Polyopic images often form in the direction and position of such visual field defects. Current research shows that when stimuli are close to the patient's scotoma, the latency of polyopic images is much shorter than if the stimuli was far from the scotoma, and there is a higher probability that polyopic images will result.

== Causes ==
Though there is no clear cause of cerebral polyopia, many cases show associations with occipital or temporal lobe lesions. Most cases of polyopia occur when there are bilateral lesions to occipital or temporal cortex, however some cases are present with unilateral lesions. Thus, polyopia can result from any kind of infarction to the occipital or temporal lobes, though the exact mechanism remains unclear. Some cases have shown that polyopia is experienced when the infarctions were seen to be at the tips and outer surfaces of the occipital lobes. By contrast, some patients experience cerebral polyopia associated with headaches and migraines in the frontotemporal lobe.

The mechanism of infarction differs by patient, but polyopia is experienced most commonly in patients that have epilepsy in the occipital cortex, or in patients who suffer from cerebral strokes. In cases of epilepsy, polyopia is often experienced alongside palinopsia as these two conditions share an epileptic mechanism.

== Theories of cerebral polyopia ==
The preliminary theory of cerebral polyopia proposed by Bender postulated that polyopia occurs as a result of instability of fixation due to occipital lobe disease. Under this explanation, small, involuntary eye movements that accompanied normal fixation were the cause of polyopic images. These involuntary eye movements lead to the development of new retinal and corresponding cortical regions that code for central vision called false maculae. Thus, polyopic images resulted from the stimulation of both the original and acquired maculae.

However, Bender's theory does not account for recent studies in which fixation did not change and no eye movements were produced while polyopia was experienced, therefore polyopic images were not a result of involuntary eye movements. Instead, Cornblath offers a possible pathophysiological mechanism in which polyopia results from the recoding of visual receptive fields in primary visual cortex (Area V1). The report of polyopic images of complex objects at fixation suggests that the disorder is not limited to lower-order visual areas in occipital cortex (in which simple features such as borders and angles are encoded), but rather it involves the interaction between lower-order visual areas in the occipital lobe and higher-order visual areas in the temporal lobe that is postulated to code whole objects.

Another possible pathophysiological mechanism for this disorder is the reorganization of receptive fields of neurons close to the damaged area of visual cortex. This theory is supported by findings that parafoveal retinal lesions deprive a region of striate cortex of visual input, and as a result, the receptive fields of neurons near the boundary of the deprived cortical region enlarge and expand into nearby regions of the visual field. Thus, polyopia results from altered coding of contour information by neurons near the lesioned area. This mechanism offers that after a focal lesion of neurons in striate cortex, or following a retinal lesion depriving these neurons of visual input, the receptive fields of nearby healthy neurons converge to code information about contours of objects normally coded by the damaged neurons while still coding the same information about retinal location prior to the injury. This mechanism may explain why polyopia extending into a patient's scotoma occurs following damage to primary visual cortex.

== Treatment ==
Since this condition is usually coupled with other neurological disorders or deficits, there is no known cure for cerebral polyopia. However, measures can be taken to reduce the effects of associated disorders, which have proven to reduce the effects of polyopia. In a case of occipital lobe epilepsy, the patient experienced polyopia. Following administration of valproate sodium to reduce headaches, the patient's polyopia was reduced to palinopsia. Further, after administering the anticonvulsant drug Gabapentin in addition to valproate sodium, the effects of palinopsia were decreased, as visual perseveration is suppressed by this anticonvulsant drug. Thus, in cases of epilepsy, anticonvulsant drugs may prove to reduce the effects of polyopia and palinopsia, a topic of which should be further studied.

In other cases of polyopia, it is necessary to determine all other present visual disturbances before attempting treatment. Neurological imaging can be performed to determine if there are present occipital or temporal lobe infarctions that may be causing the polyopia. CT scans are relatively insensitive to the presence of cerebral lesions, so other neurological imaging such as PET and MRI may be performed. The presence of seizures and epilepsy may also be assessed through EEG. In addition, motor visual function should be assessed through examination of pupillary reactions, ocular motility, optokinetic nystagmus, slit-lamp examination, visual field examination, visual acuity, stereo vision, bimicroscopic examination, and funduscopic examination. Once the performance of such functions have been assessed, a plan for treatment can follow accordingly. Further research should be conducted to determine if the treatment of associated neurological disturbances can reduce the effects of polyopia.
