= Palinopsia =

Visual disorder in which images persist after removal of their stimuli

- Specialty: Ophthalmology

Palinopsia (from Greek palin 'again' and opsia 'seeing') is the persistent recurrence of a visual image after the stimulus has been removed. Palinopsia is not a diagnosis; it is a diverse group of pathological visual symptoms with a wide variety of causes. Visual perseveration is synonymous with palinopsia.

In 2014, Gersztenkorn and Lee comprehensively reviewed all cases of palinopsia in the literature and subdivided them into two clinically relevant groups: illusory palinopsia and hallucinatory palinopsia. Hallucinatory palinopsia, usually due to seizures or posterior cortical lesions, describes afterimages that are formed, long-lasting, and high resolution. Illusory palinopsia, usually due to migraines, head trauma, prescription drugs, visual snow syndrome or hallucinogen persisting perception disorder (HPPD), describes afterimages that are affected by ambient light and motion and are unformed, indistinct, or low resolution.

== Presentation ==
People with palinopsia frequently report other visual illusions and hallucinations such as photopsias, dysmetropsia i.e. Alice in Wonderland syndrome (micropsia, macropsia, teleopsia, and pelopsia), visual snow, oscillopsia, entoptic phenomena, and cerebral polyopia.

== Cause ==
Posterior visual pathway cortical lesions (tumor, abscess, hemorrhage, infarction, arteriovenous malformation, cortical dysplasia, aneurysm) and various seizure causes (hyperglycemia, ion channel mutations, Creutzfeldt–Jakob disease, idiopathic seizures, etc.) cause focal cortical hyperactivity or hyperexcitability, resulting in inappropriate, persistent activation of a visual memory circuit.

== Pathophysiology ==
Illusory palinopsia is a dysfunction of visual perception, resulting from diffuse, persistent alterations in neuronal excitability that affect physiological mechanisms of light or motion perception. Illusory palinopsia is caused by migraines, visual snow, HPPD, prescription drugs, head trauma, or may be idiopathic. Trazodone, nefazodone, mirtazapine, topiramate, clomiphene, oral contraceptives, and risperidone have been reported to cause illusory palinopsia. A patient frequently has multiple types of illusory palinopsia, which represent dysfunctions in both light and motion perception. Light and motion are processed via different pathways, suggesting diffuse or global excitability alterations.

== Diagnosis ==
=== Differentiation from physiological afterimages ===
Palinopsia is a pathological symptom and should be distinguished from physiological afterimages, a common and benign phenomenon. Physiological afterimages appear when viewing a bright stimulus and shifting visual focus. For example, after staring at a computer screen and looking away, a vague afterimage of the screen remains in the visual field. A stimulus consistently produces the same afterimage, which is dependent on the stimulus intensity and contrast, the time of fixation, and the retinal adaptation state. Physiological afterimages are usually the complementary color of the original stimulus (negative afterimage), while palinoptic afterimages are usually the same color as the original stimulus (positive afterimage). There is some ambiguity between illusory palinopsia and physiological afterimages since there are not concrete symptomatic criteria which determines if an afterimage is pathological.

=== Illusory versus hallucinatory ===
Illusory palinopsia is due to an abnormality in the original perception of a stimulus and is similar to a visual illusion: the distorted perception of a real external stimulus. Hallucinatory palinopsia is due to an abnormality after a stimulus has been encoded in visual memory and is similar to a complex visual hallucination: the creation of a formed visual image where none exists.

External conditions such as stimulus intensity, background contrast, fixation, and movement typically affect the generation and severity of illusory palinopsia but not hallucinatory palinopsia. Illusory palinopsia consists of afterimages that are short-lived or unformed, occur in the same location in the visual field as the original stimulus, and are continuous or predictable. Hallucinatory palinopsia describes formed afterimages and scenes that are lifelike, high-resolution, long-lasting, occur anywhere in the visual field, and are unpredictable. Illusory palinopsia are caused by diffuse neuronal pathology such as global alterations in neurotransmitter receptors, while hallucinatory palinopsia is typically caused by focal cortical pathology.

The clinical characteristics that separate illusory from hallucinatory palinopsia also help differentiate and assess risk in visual illusions and hallucinations. Complex (formed) visual hallucinations are more worrisome than simple visual hallucinations or visual illusions.

== Research ==
Research needs to be performed on the efficacy of the various pharmaceuticals for treating illusory palinopsia. It is unclear if the symptoms' natural history and treatment are influenced by the cause. It is also not clear if there is treatment efficacy overlap for illusory palinopsia and the other co-existing diffuse persistent illusory phenomenon such as visual snow, oscillopsia, dysmetropsia, and halos.

Future advancements in fMRI could potentially further our understanding of hallucinatory palinopsia and visual memory. Increased accuracy in fMRI might also allow for the observation of subtle metabolic or perfusional changes in illusory palinopsia, without the use of ionizing radiation present in CT scans and radioactive isotopes. Studying the psychophysics of light and motion perception could advance our understanding of illusory palinopsia, and vice versa. For example, incorporating patients with visual trailing into motion perception studies could advance our understanding of the mechanisms of visual stability and motion suppression during eye movements (e.g. saccadic suppression).
