= Hallucinogen persisting perception disorder =

Persistence of visual distortions after using drugs

- A visual simulation of HPPD, often referred to as visual snow
- Specialty: Psychiatry
- Symptoms: Visual disturbance
- Types: Type I: brief, random flashbacks; Type II: chronic, long-term, and severe form
- Causes: Primarily associated with the use of psychedelic substances
- Prognosis: Type I: may resolve within months to years; Type II: considered lifelong

Hallucinogen persisting perception disorder (HPPD) is a non-psychotic disorder in which a person experiences lasting or persistent visual hallucinations or perceptual distortions after using drugs such as psychedelics, dissociatives, deliriants, entactogens, and cannabinoids. These symptoms are often partnered with functional impairment and distress.

Symptoms may include visual snow, trails and after images (palinopsia), light fractals on flat surfaces, intensified colors, altered motion perception, pareidolia, micropsia, and macropsia. Floaters and visual snow may occur in other conditions. The symptoms may resemble the substance that induced it.

For the diagnosis, other psychological, psychiatric, and neurological conditions must be ruled out, and they must cause distress in everyday life. In the DSM-5 it is diagnostic code 292.89 (F16.983). In the ICD-10, the diagnosis code F16.7 corresponds most closely. It is rarely recognized by hallucinogen users and psychiatrists, and is differentiated from hallucinogen-induced psychotic disorder in that it does not involve paranoia, insomnia, changes in thinking, or delusions, and relates to lasting visual changes only.

The disorder is divided into two types, HPPD I and HPPD II. The more drastic cases, as seen in HPPD II, are believed to be caused by the use of psychedelics as well as associated mental disorders. Some people report symptoms after their first use of drugs (most notably LSD). There is little information on effective treatments.

The underlying mechanisms are not well understood. One hypothesis suggests that anxiety may amplify existing visual disturbances and potentially trigger these visual phenomena. Many report that their visual distortions become more pronounced or even emerge during periods of heightened anxiety or stress.

== Symptoms ==
Typical symptoms of the disorder include halos or auras surrounding objects, trails following objects in motion, difficulty distinguishing between colors, apparent shifts in the hue of a given item, the illusion of movement in a static setting, visual snow, distortions in the dimensions of a perceived object, intensified hypnagogic and hypnopompic hallucinations, monocular double vision, seeing an excessive amount of eye floaters, the morphing of multiple objects into one texture, and blue field entoptic phenomenon. The visual alterations experienced by those with HPPD are not homogeneous, and there appear to be individual differences in both the number and intensity of symptoms.

Visual aberrations can occur periodically in healthy individuals – e.g., afterimages after staring at a light, noticing floaters inside the eye, blue field entoptic phenomenon, or seeing specks of light in a darkened room. However, in people with HPPD, symptoms seem typically to be worse, but complications come from the additional roles played by anxiety and fixation. Indeed, anxiety has been implicated in visual perceptual effects similar to HPPD, and authors have recognized the crucial role of attending to underlying anxiety and panic in recovering from the disorder.

There is some uncertainty about to what degree visual snow constitutes a true HPPD symptom. There are individuals who have never used a drug which could have caused the onset, but yet experience the same grainy vision reported by those with HPPD, like people with the closely-linked neurological disorder known as visual snow syndrome. There are a few potential reasons for this, the most obvious of which is the theory that the drug usage may exaggerate the intensity of visual snow. At the same time, beyond the characteristic visual snow symptom, there is considerable overlap between the conditions, including after-images, palinopsia, tinnitus, dissociation, and free-floating anxiety, leading some to suggest that HPPD shares a strong relationship with visual snow syndrome. Visual snow syndrome is defined as lacking any known cause and is specifically distinguished from HPPD in its nosology, yet further research may clarify the relationship. HPPD usually has a visual manifestation, but some hallucinogenic and psychiatric drugs affect the auditory sense and can produce tinnitus-like symptoms as a side effect, and there are many anecdotal reports of people getting tinnitus with their HPPD.

A significant number of those reporting HPPD also describe comorbid depersonalization-derealization and anxiety disorders. Anxiety, PTSD and panic can promote depersonalization-derealization and visual disturbances, and vice versa, so these features may run in multidirectional relationships. Abraham suggested that all three can arise from a broader mechanism of disinhibition in sensory perception, affect and sense-of-self occasioned by psychedelic experience. It is not uncommon for depersonalization-derealization to be the most distressing symptom of the condition.

According to a 2016 review, there are two theorized subtypes of the condition. Type 1 HPPD is where people experience random, brief flashbacks. Type 2 HPPD entails experiencing persistent changes to vision, which may vary in intensity. This model has faced scrutiny, however, due to "flashbacks" often being considered a separate condition and not always a perceptual one.

== Causes ==
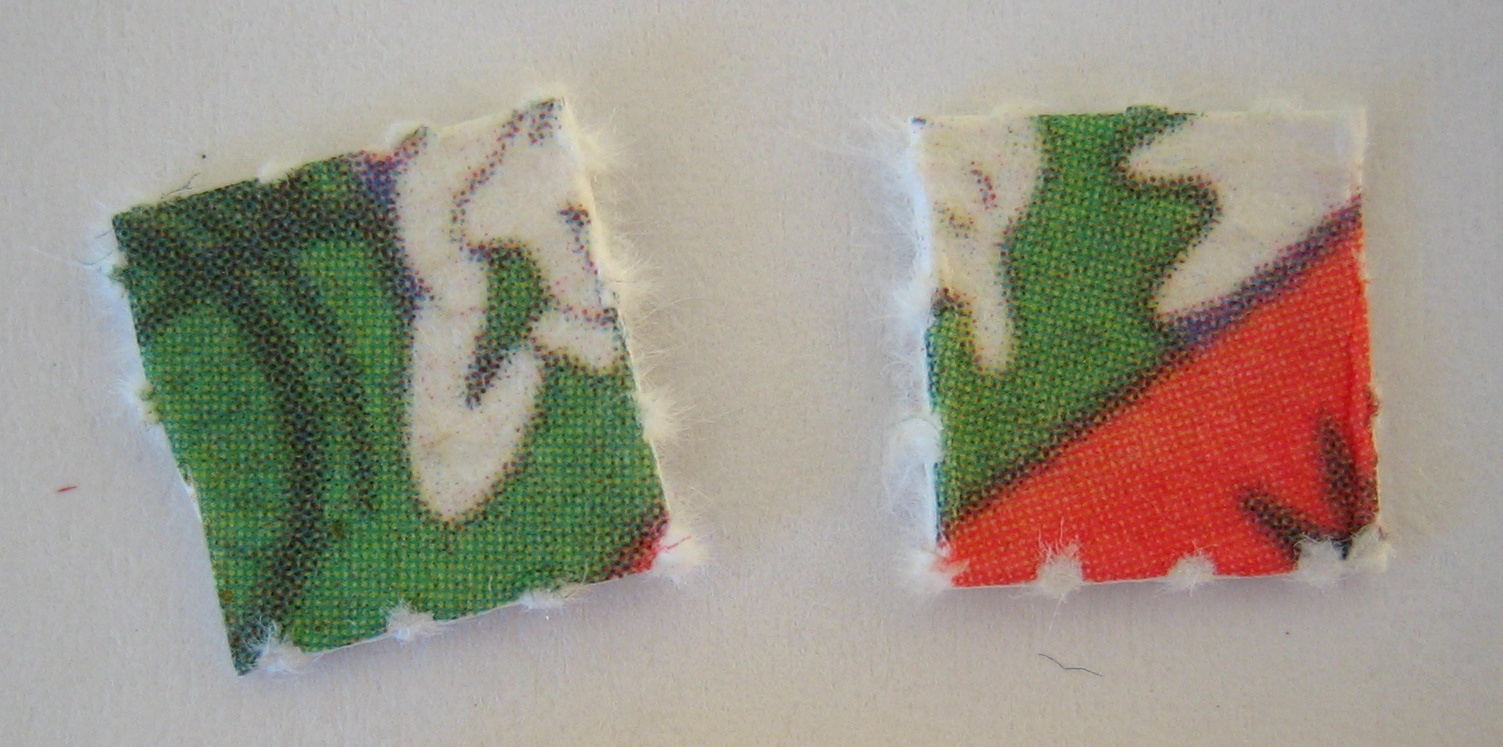
LSD is a frequent cause of HPPD.

A vast list of psychoactive substances have been linked with the development of this condition, including lysergamides like LSD and LSA, tryptamines like psilocybin and DMT, phenethylamines like 2C-B, MDMA, MDA and mescaline. Dissociatives such as ketamine and dextromethorphan as well as cannabis and synthetic cannabinoids, salvia divinorum, datura and iboga are also known to trigger HPPD. HPPD is not strictly associated with psychedelic consumption, as a number of hallucination-inducing substances may be correlated with its arising. For some, the dosage and how frequently one uses these substances does not seem to matter in the development of this condition, as there are several reports in the literature where patients were diagnosed after a single use. HPPD is more often seen in people with a history of previous psychological issues or substance misuse.

Which drugs are most prone to causing HPPD is not entirely known. While LSD has been described as the leading cause of HPPD, this may be a function of LSD's historically higher relative popularity as a recreational psychedelic drug. Popularity effects may explain the high proportion of cases precipitated by cannabis. A 2022 clinical review found no significant difference in the induction of subclinical visual phenomena between MDMA, LSD and psilocybin. Curiously, lasting visual effects have also occurred as complications of benzodiazepine withdrawal syndrome.

HPPD is more common among those with preexisting mental illness such as anxiety, depression, bipolar disorder, or schizophrenia.

== Pathophysiology ==
The exact pathophysiologic mechanism underlying HPPD is poorly understood. The primary neurobiological hypothesis is that persistent hallucinations are the result of chronic disinhibition of visual processors and subsequent dysfunction in the central nervous system following consumption of hallucinogens. Chronic disinhibition may occur from destruction and/or dysfunction of cortical serotonergic inhibitory interneurons involving the inhibitory neurotransmitter, gamma-aminobutyric acid (GABA). This ultimately can cause disruption of the normal neurological mechanisms that are responsible for filtration of unnecessary stimuli in the brain. On a macroscopic level, the lateral geniculate nucleus (LGN) of the thalamus, which is important in visual processing, has also been implicated in the pathophysiology of HPPD.

Other researchers have suggested HPPD may be related to drug-induced elevations in neuroplasticity – an effect also noted to occur for SSRIs. Reverse neuroplasticity effects may account for anecdotal reports of individuals treating their HPPD symptoms with further psychedelic drug use, while others report significant deterioriations in their symptoms.

Being characterized by clinical distress and impairment, however, HPPD is also shaped by psychosocial factors. There is tentative evidence that those who develop distressing HPPD have higher trait anxiety, or experienced elevations in baseline anxiety from possibly negative psychedelic experiences. Elevations in anxiety, and anxious responses to visual and related symptoms, may provoke direct elevations in symptom intensity and fuel the distress that defines HPPD as a clinical entity. Certain core beliefs and automatic thoughts are observed to occur among those reporting HPPD: fears of brain damage, a 'never-ending trip', the development of schizophrenia or a related psychosis spectrum disorder, a more generalized concern surrounding insanity, and destructive thoughts concerning the loss of one's previous self or a new identity centred on brokenness and alienation from others. Being a drug-related disorder, HPPD is therefore vulnerable to internalized anti-drug stigma, specifically around 'flashbacks' and 'brain frying', which were heavily propagandized in prohibitionist campaigns in the 20th-century.

== Diagnosis ==
=== Disorders with similar symptoms ===
Individuals without HPPD will sometimes notice similar visual abnormalities. These include floaters (material floating in the eye fluid that appears as black/dark objects floating in front of the eyes and are particularly visible when looking at the bright sky or on a white wall) and the white blood cells of the retinal blood vessels (seen as tiny, fast-moving, and quickly disappearing white specks). Likewise, bright lights in an otherwise dark environment may generate trails and halos. Most people don't notice these effects because they are so used to them. A person fearful of having acquired HPPD may be much more conscious about any visual disturbance, including those that are normal. In addition, visual problems can be caused by brain infections or lesions, epilepsy, and a number of mental disorders (e.g., anxiety, delirium, dementia, schizophrenia, Parkinson's disease). For an individual to be diagnosed with HPPD, these other potential causes must be ruled out.

==== Hallucinogen-induced psychotic disorder (HIPD) ====
Substance-induced psychosis from hallucinogens, also known as hallucinogen-induced psychotic disorder (HIPD), occurs when an individual experiences hallucinations, delusions, paranoia, or a reduced ability to communicate that continue beyond the initial effects of the hallucinogenic drug. Hallucinogen-induced psychotic disorder is a medical emergency. It is a psychotic reaction to a hallucinogenic drug that may indicate underlying bipolar disorder or schizophrenia. The specific treatment for hallucinogen-induced psychotic disorder is atypical antipsychotics, which includes both second and third-generation antipsychotics. Third-generation antipsychotics such as aripiprazole, brexpiprazole, cariprazine, and lurasidone, are increasingly used to treat substance-induced psychosis.

== Treatment ==
A variety of medications have been reported to be effective in treating HPPD. Essential to the treatment of HPPD is discontinuing all recreational drug use. In addition to HPPD symptoms, common comorbidities of anxiety, depression, psychosis, or sleep problems should be treated as well. Because anxiety exacerbates HPPD symptoms, studies have shown that both individual and group therapy can be effective in lowering anxiety and establishing a support network if those with HPPD are socially isolated.

=== Medication ===
Case studies indicate full or partial recovery from HPPD using a variety of medications. Recent literature reviews recommend combining agents to treat HPPD symptoms, including comorbid anxiety, depression, psychosis, and insomnia.

==== Antipsychotics ====
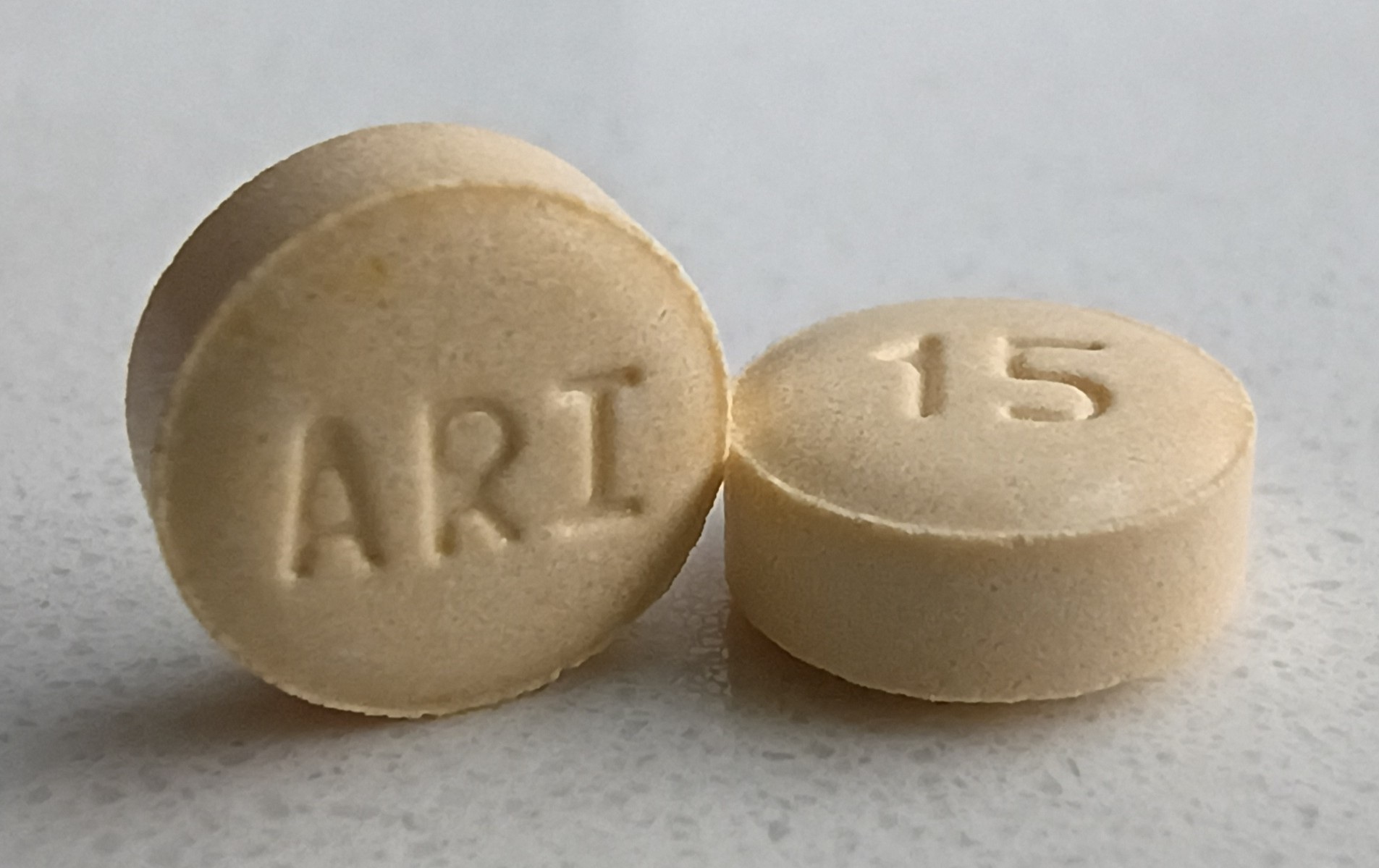
Aripiprazole (Abilify) is a third-generation antipsychotic used to treat HPPD.

Atypical antipsychotics such as the third-generation antipsychotic aripiprazole, and the second-generation antipsychotics olanzapine, and risperidone have successfully treated HPPD in a number of cases. One 16-year-old male adolescent was successfully treated with aripiprazole and achieved remission of symptoms. Risperidone was successful in treating HPPD within a few weeks in a 38-year-old woman who had symptoms of HPPD for 17 years. Two young men with HPPD and schizophrenia as a comorbidity experienced a remission of visual perceptual disturbance during a 6-month follow-up observation under treatment with risperidone. Another case report showed recovery in an 18-year-old male with a combination of risperidone and sertraline. In other cases risperidone has shown no effect on HPPD or where it had a paradoxical effect and exacerbated symptoms. Olanzapine successfully treated HPPD in a 16-year-old female adolescent. She was later switched to aripiprazole, with further success. Another case report also noted successful treatment of HPPD with a combination of olanzapine and fluoxetine.

==== Anticonvulsants ====
Lamotrigine is an anticonvulsant medication that has been tried in HPPD treatment. In the case of a 36-year-old man with HPPD for 18-years, the complex visual perception disorders largely resolved within 12 months after initiation of treatment with lamotrigine. In another case a 33-year-old woman developed HPPD after abusing LSD for a year at the age of 18. She reported afterimages, perception of movement in her peripheral visual fields, blurring of small patterns, halo effects, and macro- and micropsia. Previous treatment with antidepressants and risperidone failed to ameliorate these symptoms. Upon commencing drug therapy with lamotrigine, these complex visual disturbances receded almost completely.

Lamotrigine is generally well tolerated with a relative lack of adverse effects. However, lamotrigine has a 1 in 3,000 risk of inducing a potentially fatal allergic skin rash, Stephens-Johnson syndrome. Approximately 1 in 10 patients taking lamotrigine will experience a benign skin rash. Because of this risk, lamotrigine is generally started at a very low dose over a 2 month initial titration period.

==== Antihypertensives ====
Clonidine, an antihypertensive, that a pilot study of eight patients suggested could help significantly alleviate "LSD-related flashbacks".

==== Benzodiazepines ====
In a case study of two subjects with synthetic cannabis-induced HPPD, both patients reported significant improvement in symptoms with clonazepam treatment. In a 2003 study, 16 people with LSD-induced HPPD were treated with clonazepam and reported significant relief with only mild symptomatology remaining.

==== Antidepressants ====
Case studies have reported recoveries among patients treated with a combination of selective serotonin reuptake inhibitors (SSRIs) and atypical antipsychotics. Selective serotonin reuptake inhibitors are commonly used to treat the depression and anxiety that is often comorbid with HPPD. Antidepressants used by themselves have not shown improvement in HPPD.

=== Psychosocial ===
Individual and group therapy may be helpful as an adjunct to medication in cases of HPPD. HPPD commonly causes intense anxiety and psychotherapy may help to alleviate those effects. Case reports of psychotherapy for HPPD suggest that the anxiety reduction that therapy provides may be helpful. Group therapy may help strengthen an HPPD sufferer's support system and relieve anxiety. Some authors have suggested that HPPD be better designated as a particular somatic symptom disorder rather than a disorder defined centrally by hallucinogen use. Cognitive behavioral therapy has shown promise for somatic symptom disorders, as well as related distress from tinnitus. CBT has likewise shown promise for depersonalization-derealization disorder, which occurs as a common comorbidity to HPPD and seems to share many of the same catastrophic thoughts. The Perception Restoration Foundation hosts a Specialists Directory that lists professionals with prior experience or relevant expertise in helping those with HPPD.

=== Other ===
A 2022 case report used brain stimulation therapy to treat a 33-year-old man who had HPPD that developed after repeated use of hallucinogens at age 18.

== Prevalence ==
In a 2010 optional online survey of psychedelic users seeking medical information, 60% reported recurring HPPD-like effects, though only 4.2% considered seeking treatment due to the severity. The authors concede occurrences are rare but suggest the survey supports a need for further research. In a 2022 double-blind, placebo-controlled study, 142 subjects received LSD, psilocybin, or both, and reported no cases of HPPD. Up to 9.2% of the subjects had flashbacks which were "transient, mostly experienced as benign and did not impair daily life".

== History ==
In 1898, the English physician and intellectual Havelock Ellis reported a heightened sensitivity to what he described as "the more delicate phenomena of light and shade and color" for a prolonged period of time after he was exposed to the hallucinogenic drug mescaline. This may have been one of the first recorded symptoms of what would later be called HPPD. Hallucinogen-persisting perception disorder was first described in 1954, with other observations made in early psychedelic research. Horowitz first introduced the term flashbacks, referring to recurrent and spontaneous perceptual distortions and unbidden images. When these "flashbacks" present as recurrent, but without a current acute or chronic hallucinogen intake, the disturbance is referred to as HPPD. Horowitz classified also three types of visual flashbacks: (a) perceptual distortions (e.g., seeing haloes around objects); (b) heightened imagery (e.g., visual experiences as much more vivid and dominant in one's thoughts); and (c) recurrent unbidden images (e.g., subjects see objects that are not there). LSD therapist Stanislav Grof noted an HPPD phenomenon in his book LSD Psychotherapy from 1978, which noted that "[l]ong after the pharmacological effect of the drug has subsided, the patient may still report anomalies in color-perception, blurred vision, after-images, spontaneous imagery, alterations in body image, intensification of hearing, ringing in the ears, or various strange physical feelings."

HPPD was introduced under the diagnosis of Post-hallucinogen Perception Disorder in 1987 within the DSM-III-R. Subsequently, the DSM-IV-TR recognized the syndrome as Hallucinogen-Persisting Perception Disorder (Flashbacks) (code 292.89) (15).

== Society and culture ==
In 1971, Shelagh McDonald withdrew from the music industry until 2005 after experiencing severe HPPD.

In the second episode of the first season of the 2014 series True Detective ("Seeing Things"), primary character Rustin Cohle (Matthew McConaughey) is depicted as having symptoms similar to HPPD such as light tracers as a result of "neurological damage" from substance use.

American journalist Andrew Callaghan, former host of the internet series All Gas No Brakes and current host of Channel 5, stated during a 2021 interview with Vice News that he experiences the symptoms of HPPD as a result of psilocybin use at 14 years old. Describing his symptoms, he noted that he experiences persistent visual snow and palinopsia.

American YouTuber, comedian, and musician Matt Watson stated in 2022 that he acquired HPPD after trying LSD years prior, and that he still experienced several symptoms associated with HPPD, such as persistent floaters in his vision and visual "static".

American singer-songwriter and comedian Will Wood stated in a 2022 interview that he was inspired to create his song "White Noise" because of his experience with HPPD. The song "He'll Use Me for His Needle Show" by A Verbal Equinox, one of Wood's previous bands, also mentions HPPD.

In 2017, a psychedelic substances outpatient clinic was established at Alexianer St. Hedwig Hospital in Berlin. The clinic focuses on treating patients who have experienced problems, including HPPD and HIPD, after taking psychedelics. In 2025, the Johns Hopkins Post Psychedelic Difficulties Clinic was established in Baltimore to treat HPPD, HIPD, and other post-psychedelic disorders.

== See also ==
- Hallucinogen-induced psychotic disorder (HIPD)
- Psychedelic syndrome
- Risks of psychedelic drugs
- Substance-induced psychosis
