= Hallucinatory palinopsia =

- Specialty: Ophthalmology

Hallucinatory palinopsia is a subtype of palinopsia, a visual disturbance defined as the persistent or recurrence of a visual image after the stimulus has been removed. Palinopsia is a broad term describing a group of symptoms which is divided into hallucinatory palinopsia and illusory palinopsia. Hallucinatory palinopsia refers to the projection of an already-encoded visual memory and is similar to a complex visual hallucination: the creation of a formed visual image where none exists.

Hallucinatory palinopsia usually arises from posterior cortical lesions or seizures and can be the presenting symptom of a serious neurological disease. Hallucinatory palinopsia describes afterimages or scenes that are formed, long-lasting, high resolution, and isochromatic. The palinoptic images are not typically reliant on environmental parameters and often present with homonymous visual field deficits. Hallucinatory palinopsia occurs unpredictably and the persistent images can appear anywhere in the visual field, regardless of the location of the original stimulus. A patient will often have only a few episodes of hallucinatory palinopsia. Visual perseveration is synonymous with palinopsia. The term is from Greek: palin for "again" and opsia for "seeing".

== Signs and symptoms ==
=== Formed image perseveration ===
Formed image perseveration refers to a single, stationary object that remains fixed in one's visual field. These pathological afterimages look realistic and have the same color and clarity as the original stimulus. The palinopsia lasts at least 15 seconds, but may persist for hours or days. For example, a patient sees a cat, and an identical copy of the cat remains fixed in the field of view for 30 minutes. A patient commonly complains of the perseverated fingers of an examiner. These afterimages often occur in visual field deficits but may occur anywhere in the visual field, regardless of the location of the original stimulus. The generation of the afterimages is not affected by external conditions such as the length of fixation, brightness of the stimulus, contrast, or motion. The palinoptic image can appear immediately after seeing the original image or may be delayed in time.

=== Scene perseveration ===
Scene perseveration refers to seeing a previously-viewed, short stereotyped scene that continuously replays for several minutes. For example, a patient might view a person throwing a ball, and then an hour later, perceives the same action sequence repeated many times. The palinoptic scene usually has the same color and clarity as the original. Our understanding of visual memory considers a short scene as a unit of memory, similar to an image, thus scene perseveration is probably mechanistically related to formed image perseveration.

=== Categorical incorporation ===
Categorical incorporation refers to seeing an object or feature and superimposing it onto comparable objects or people. For example, after seeing a person wearing a hat, that same hat is seen on each subsequent person seen. Or a person sees the spire of a building and then incorporates it to the top of other structures seen. The palinoptic images have the same characteristics as the original stimulus, and episodes of categorical incorporation usually last a few minutes. Categorical incorporation highlights the brain's use of constructs to process stimuli.

=== Patterned visual spread ===
Patterned visual spread describes the spread of a pattern in a field of view. For example, a patient sees a checkered pattern on a lamp, which then contiguously spreads to objects such as the floor or a desk. Contextual clues do not influence patterned visual spread, distinguishing it from categorical incorporation.

== Cause ==
Of the published cases of palinopsia from posterior cortical lesions or seizures, 93% described hallucinatory palinopsia. Hallucinatory palinopsia may be caused by many types of posterior cortical lesions such as neoplasms, infarctions, hemorrhages, arteriovenous malformations, aneurysm, abscesses, and tuberculomas. Hallucinatory palinopsia from seizures may be secondary to a focal cortical lesion or may be secondary to a non-structural disturbance. Causes of seizures that are reported to cause palinopsia include metabolic disturbances (hyperglycemia, carnitine deficiency), ion channel disturbances, Creutzfeldt–Jakob disease, and seizures of unknown cause.

== Pathophysiology ==
Hallucinatory palinopsia is a dysfunction of visual memory, caused by localized cortical hyperexcitability or hyperactivity in the posterior visual pathway. Post-geniculate cortical lesions or seizures may cause cortical deafferentation, focal cortical irritation, and epileptic discharges, the proposed mechanisms of hallucinatory palinopsia.

=== Cortical deafferentation ===
Palinopsia can occur from posterior visual pathway (post-geniculate) deafferentation, which causes homonymous visual field deficits. This mechanism is thought to be similar to the deafferentation hyperexcitability seen in visual release hallucinations (Charles Bonnet syndrome), which are distinguished from palinopsia by whether the formed image or scene previously occurred. It is hypothesized that deafferentation hyperexcitability is the cause of neuropathic pain. Molecular changes from deafferentation include an increase in presynaptic neurotransmitter vesicles and heightened post-synaptic receptor sensitivity.

=== Epileptic discharges ===
Palinopsia from epileptic discharges, confirmed by electroencephalogram, have been reported during a seizure aura, during the seizure, or post-ictally. The seizures can originate anywhere in the posterior visual pathway, depending on the location of the pathology. Palinoptic seizures rarely generalize, and there are case reports of palinopsia as the only symptom of a visual seizure. If seizures are persistent, then continual palinoptic episodes often occur.

=== Focal cortical irritation ===
Palinopsia, which occurs after neurosurgical procedures or cerebrovascular accidents, has been partly attributed to focal cortical irritation. Symptoms are associated with perilesional hyperperfusion, which may reflect focal cortical instability and subsequent hyperactivity.

While there are reports of palinopsia from each individual mechanism, there is usually a combination of the aforementioned mechanisms. For example, hallucinatory palinopsia may present in a patient with seizure symptoms and visual field deficits, after a neurosurgical procedure. This suggests that the cortical hyperactivity from each mechanism is additive. "Hallucinatory palinopsia, once considered a disorder of the nondominant parieto-occipital lobe, has since been shown to occur from lesions in the dominant or non-dominant temporal, parietal, or occipital lobes. ... The predominance of lesions in certain cortical areas is more likely due to the uneven distribution or functional variation of visual cortex-hippocampal neurons. ... All of the hallucinatory palinopsia symptoms occur concomitantly in a patient with one lesion, which supports current evidence that objects, features, and scenes are all units of visual memory, perhaps at different levels of processing. This alludes to neuroanatomical integration in visual memory creation and storage."

== Diagnosis ==
Palinopsia necessitates a full ophthalmologic and neurologic history and physical exam. Hallucinatory palinopsia warrants automated visual field testing and neuroimaging since the majority of hallucinatory palinopsia is caused by posterior cortical lesions and seizures. It is generally easy to diagnose the underlying cause of hallucinatory palinopsia. The medical history typically includes concerning symptoms, and neuroimaging usually reveals cortical lesions. In patients with hallucinatory palinopsia and unremarkable neuroimaging, blood tests or clinical history often hints at the cause. The practitioner should be considering visual seizures in these cases.

== Treatment ==
Palinopsia from cerebrovascular accidents generally resolves spontaneously, and treatment should be focused on the vasculopathic risk factors. Palinopsia from neoplasms, AVMs, or abscesses require treatment of the underlying condition, which usually also resolves the palinopsia. Palinopsia due to seizures generally resolves after correcting the primary disturbance and/or treating the seizures. In persistent hallucinatory palinopsia, a trial of an anti-epileptic drug can be attempted. Anti-epileptics reduce cortical excitability and could potentially treat palinopsia caused by cortical deafferentation or cortical irritation. Patients with idiopathic hallucinatory palinopsia should have close follow-up.
