= Memory storage =

Memory storage may refer to:

- Psychological term for storage (memory) of mental states
- Computer hardware that acts as a data storage device
- Computer process for holding data (computer data storage)
