= Negative (photography) =

Image on photographic film

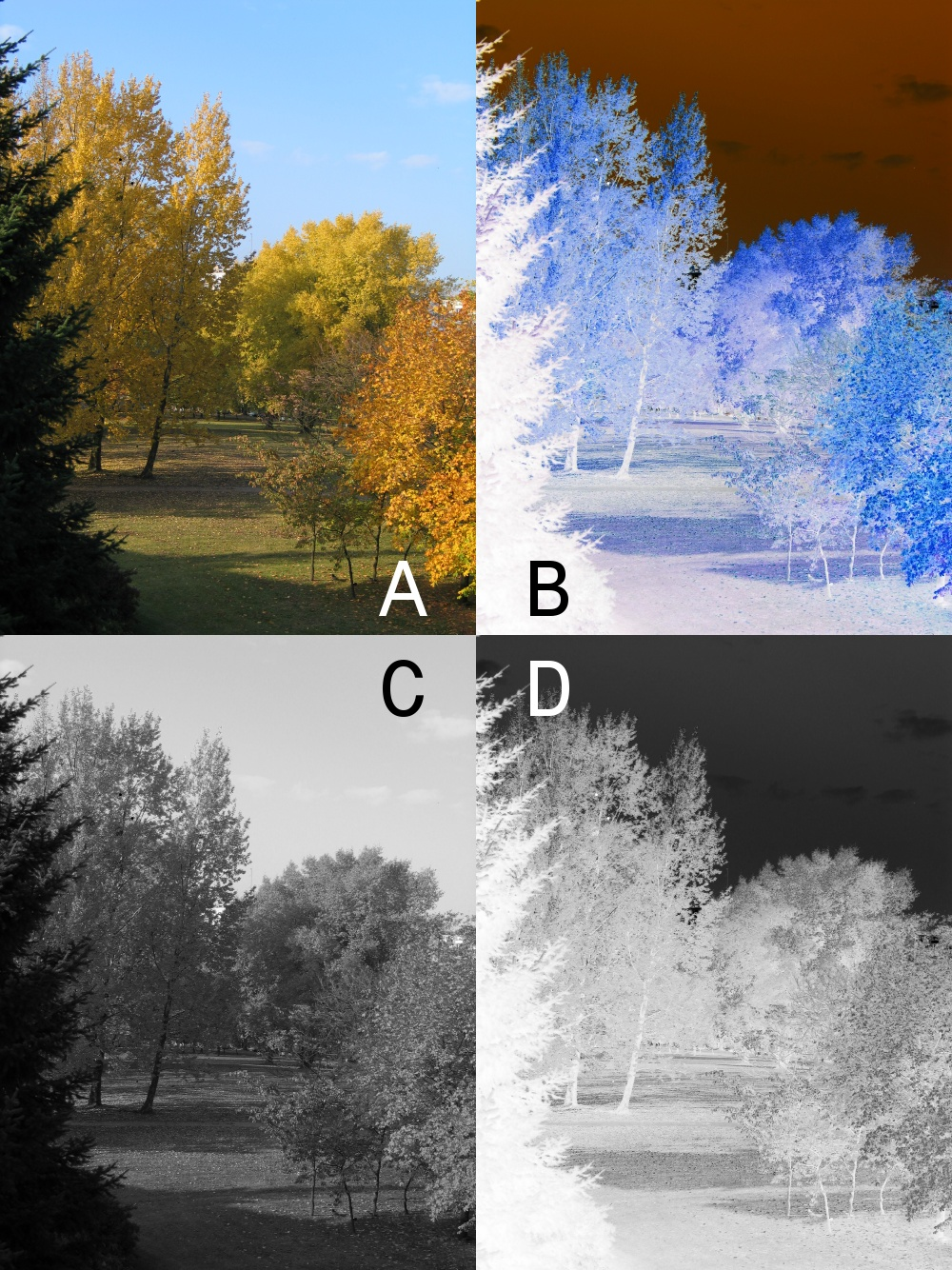
Color positive picture (A) and negative (B), monochrome positive picture (C) and negative (D)

In photography, a negative is an image, usually on a strip or sheet of transparent plastic film, in which the lightest areas of the photographed subject appear darkest and the darkest areas appear lightest. This reversed order occurs because the extremely light-sensitive chemicals a camera film must use to capture an image quickly enough for ordinary picture-taking are darkened, rather than bleached, by exposure to light and subsequent photographic processing.

In the case of color negatives, the colors are also reversed into their respective complementary colors. Typical color negatives have an overall dull orange tint due to an automatic color-masking feature that ultimately results in improved color reproduction.

Negatives are normally used to make positive prints on photographic paper by projecting the negative onto the paper with a photographic enlarger or making a contact print. The paper is also darkened in proportion to its exposure to light, so a second reversal results which restores light and dark to their normal order.

Negatives were once commonly made on a thin sheet of glass rather than a plastic film, and some of the earliest negatives were made on paper.

Transparent positive prints can be made by printing a negative onto special positive film, as is done to make traditional motion picture film prints for use in theaters. Some films used in cameras are designed to be developed by reversal processing, which produces the final positive, instead of a negative, on the original film. Positives on film or glass are known as transparencies or diapositives, and if mounted in small frames designed for use in a slide projector or magnifying viewer they are commonly called slides.

== Negative image ==
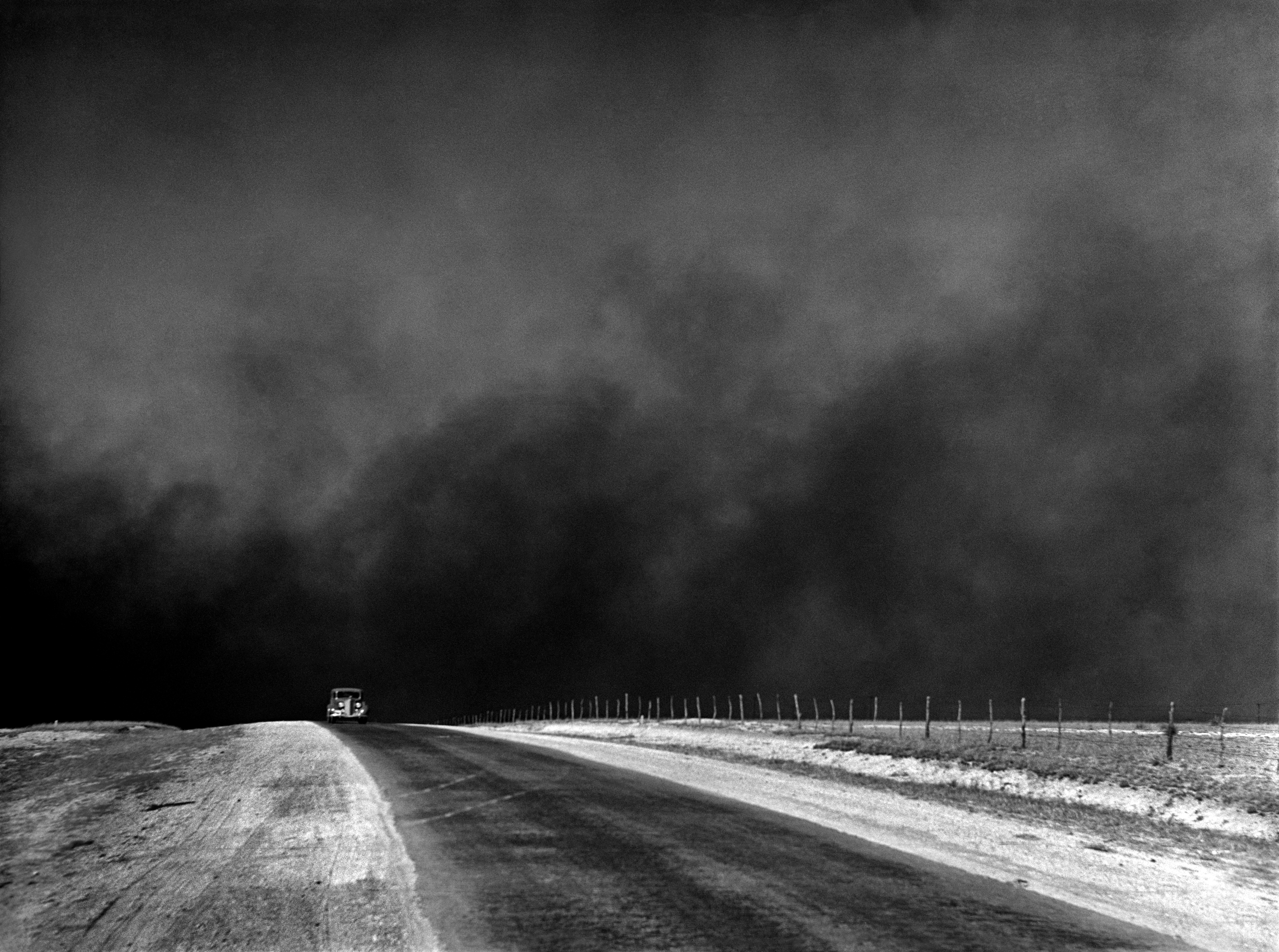
Positive image showing a dust storm during the Dust Bowl period, Texas Panhandle, United States.

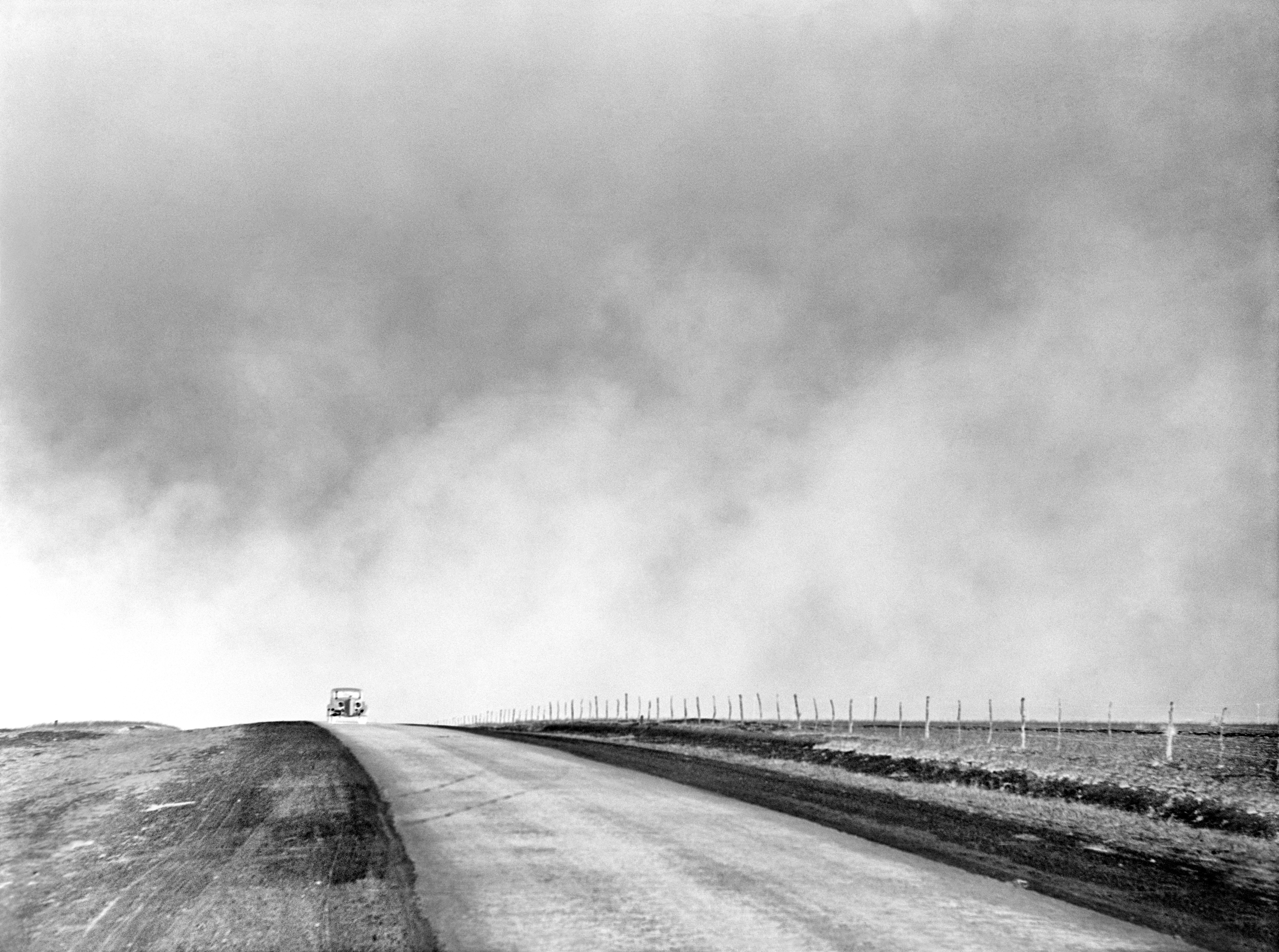
A negative of the previous image.

Positive color	Negative color

A positive image is a normal image. A negative image is a total inversion, in which light areas appear dark and vice versa. A negative color image is additionally color-reversed, with red areas appearing cyan, greens appearing magenta, and blues appearing yellow, and vice versa.

Under a phenomenon known as the 'negative picture illusion', a negative image can be briefly experienced by the human visual system where an afterimage persists subsequent to a prolonged gaze.

Film negatives usually have less contrast, but a wider dynamic range, than the final printed positive images. The contrast typically increases when they are printed onto photographic paper. When negative film images are brought into the digital realm, their contrast may be adjusted at the time of scanning or, more usually, during subsequent post-processing.

== Negative film ==
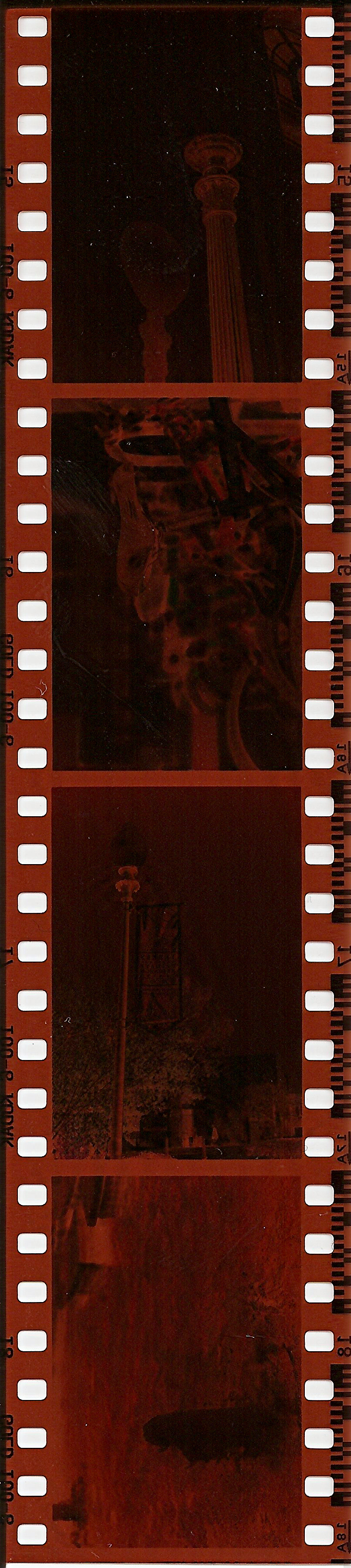
A strip of four color negatives on 35 mm film that show some images of what looks like a fire hydrant, street lights etc.

Film for cameras that use the 35 mm still format is sold as a long strip of emulsion-coated and perforated plastic spooled in a light-tight cassette. Before each exposure, a mechanism inside the camera is used to pull an unexposed area of the strip out of the cassette and into position behind the camera lens. When all exposures have been made the strip is rewound into the cassette. After the film is chemically developed, the strip shows a series of small negative images. It is usually then cut into sections for easier handling. Medium format cameras use 120 film, which yields a strip of negatives 60 mm wide, and large format cameras capture each image on a single sheet of film which may be as large as 20 x 25 cm (8 x 10 inches) or even larger. Each of these photographed images may be referred to as a negative and an entire strip or set of images may be collectively referred to as "the negatives". They are the master images, from which all positive prints will derive, so they are handled and stored with special care.

Many photographic processes create negative images: the chemicals involved react when exposed to light, so that during development they produce deposits of microscopic dark silver particles or colored dyes in proportion to the amount of exposure. However, when a negative image is created from a negative image (just like multiplying two negative numbers in mathematics) a positive image results. This makes most chemical-based photography a two-step process, which uses negative film and ordinary processing. Special films and development processes have been devised so that positive images can be created directly on the film; these are called positive, or slide, or (perhaps confusingly) reversal films and reversal processing.

Despite the market's evolution away from film, there is still a desire and market for products which allow fine art photographers to produce negatives from digital images for their use in alternative processes such as cyanotypes, gum bichromate, platinum prints, and many others. Such negative images, however, can have less permanence and less accuracy in reproduction than their digital counterparts.

== Negative images and digital processing ==
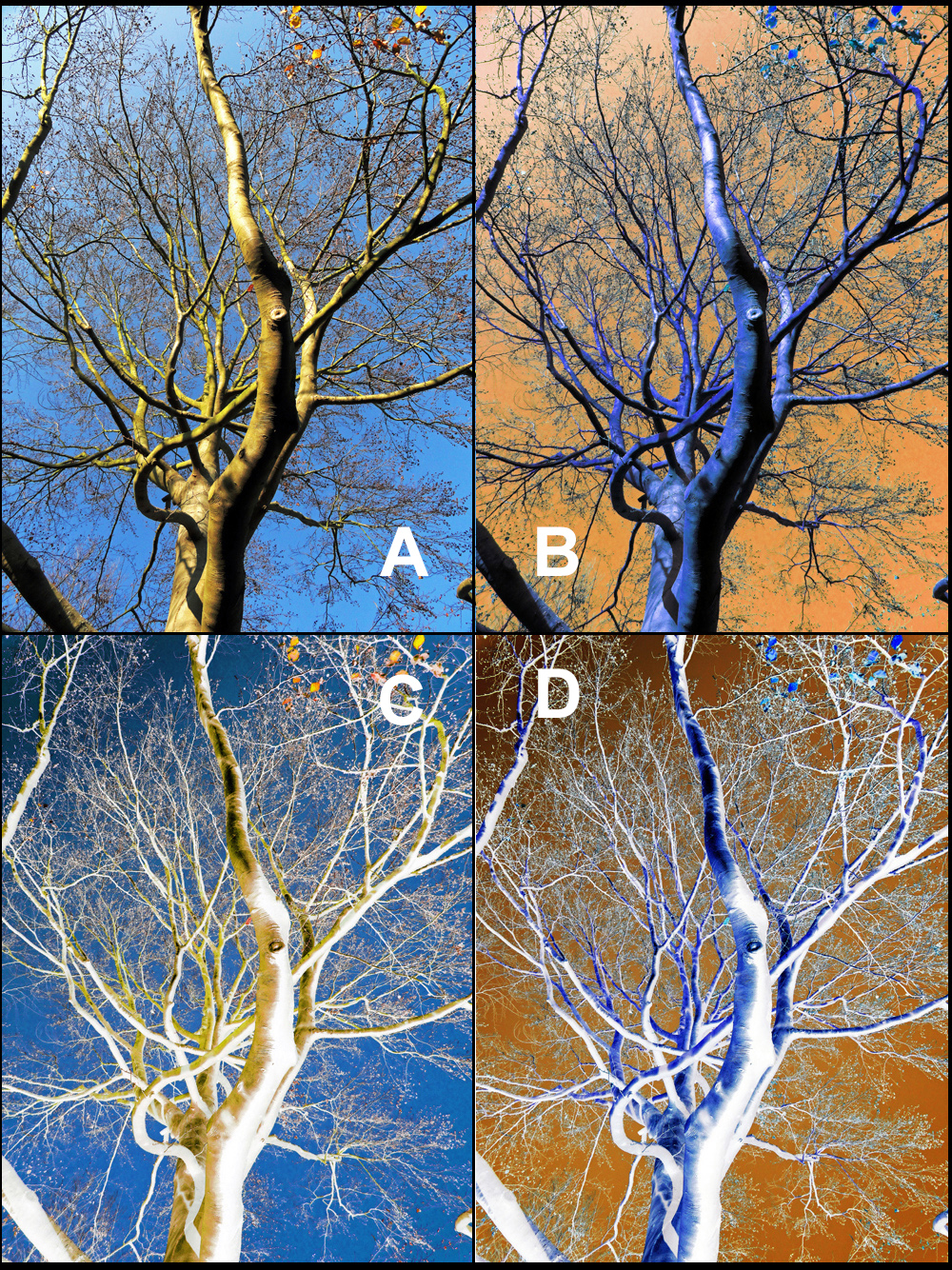
Full positive picture (A); color negative, luminance positive (B); color positive, luminance negative (C); and full negative (D).

A negative image can allow a different perception of an everyday scene, perhaps highlighting spatial relationships and details that are less obvious in the positive image. The advent of digital image processing has expanded the possibilities. In a physical photograph the color and luminance can only be inverted in tandem, but digital processing allows each to be inverted separately. If the hue of an image is rotated by 180 degrees, then the color of the image is inverted but not its luminance. The negative of such an image has the luminance inverted but not the color. Whereas a physical image can be either 'inverted' or 'not inverted', a digital image can exhibit a partial degree of color inversion in so far as the hue can be altered by plus or minus some number of degrees which is greater than zero degrees but less than 180 degrees.
