= Spectropia =

1864 book by John Henry Brown

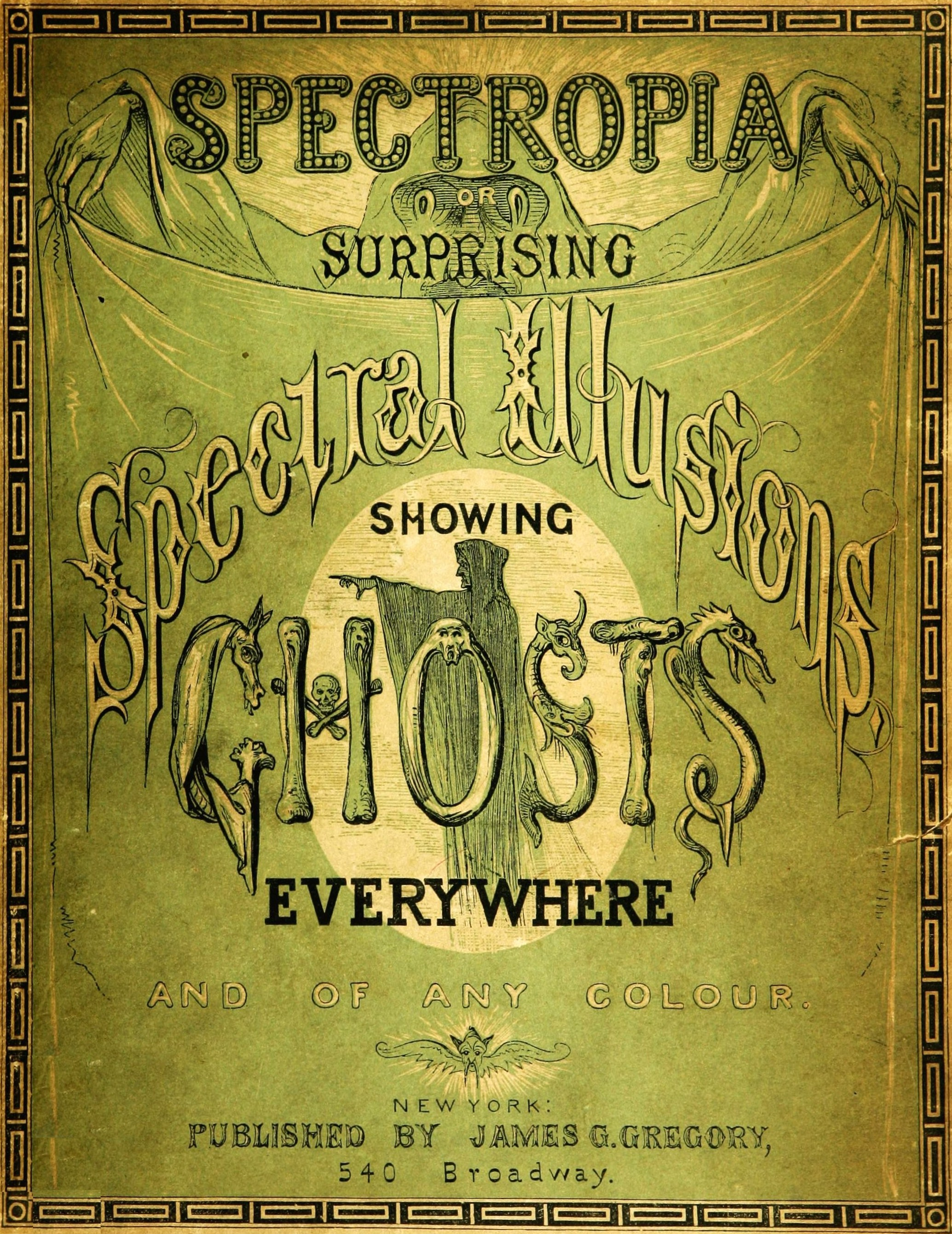
- Cover page
- Author: J. H. Brown
- Language: English
- Genre: Optical illusions
- Publisher: James G. Gregory (New York City); Griffith and Farran (London)
- Publication date: 1864
- Publication place: United States
- Media type: Print
- Pages: 27
- OCLC: 1165364
- Text: Spectropia at Wikisource

Spectropia, or, surprising spectral illusions showing ghosts everywhere and of any colour is an optical illusion book by J. H. Brown, first published in 1864.

== Publication ==
Initial printings of Spectropia were made in New York City by James G. Gregory, and in London by Griffith and Farran.

With sixteen large lithographed plates (thirteen of which were hand-coloured), Spectropia includes several sections; namely an introduction, directions, and one called "Popular and Scientific description." The writing, spanning over eleven pages in addition to the plates makes for a total of twenty-seven pages. The cover is bound on green cloth, with a height of 25 cm (9 7/8 inches)

An edition with "fancy boards" sold for two shillings and sixpence, and an edition with the plates mounted on cloth sold for an extra shilling. A Dutch edition translated by Hugo Suringar Leeuwarden of Spectropia was published in 1866. Additionally, a second edition was published in 1870.

== Contents ==
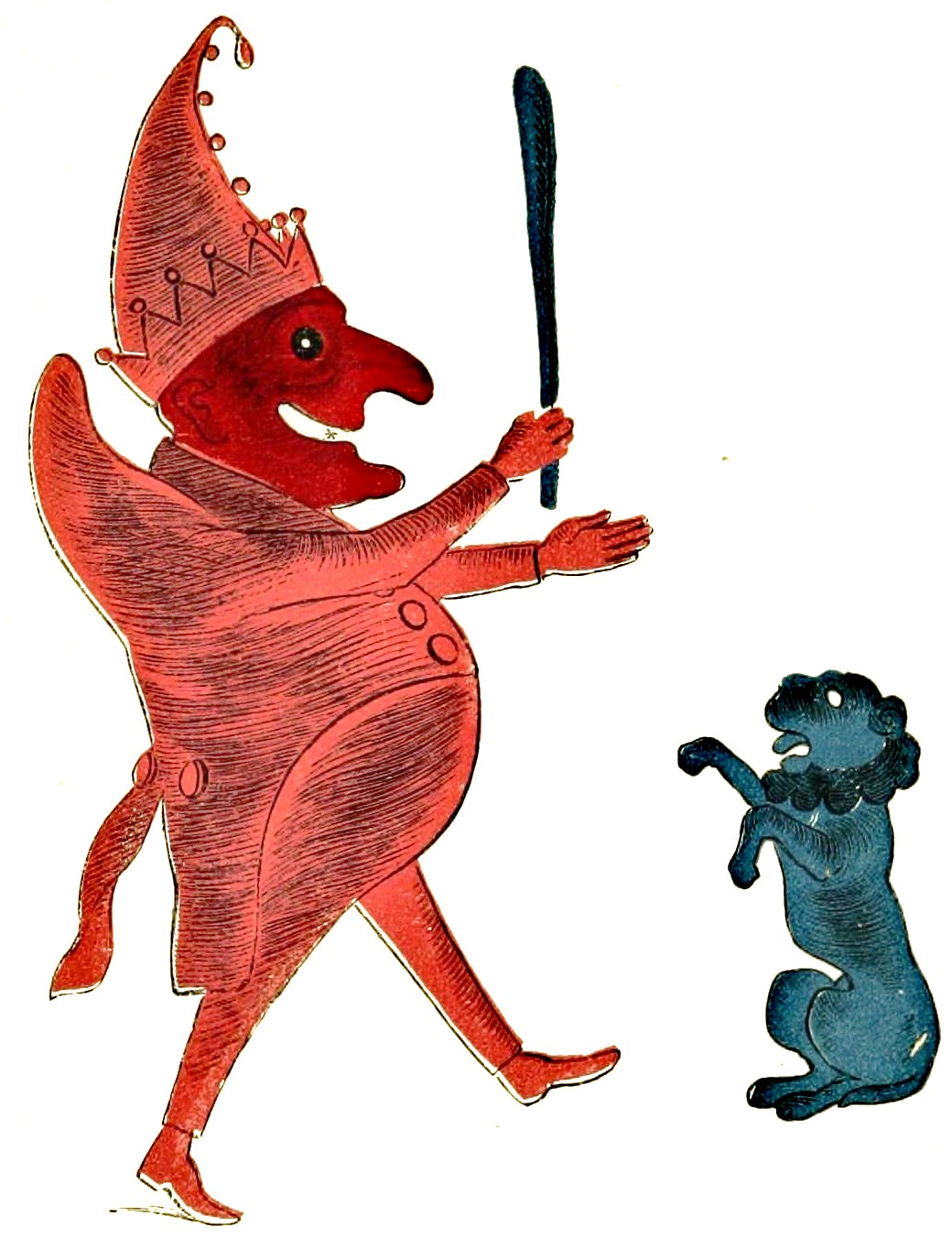
Plate XIV

Brown was distressed by an increased public interest in spiritualism, something which he deemed a "mental epidemic." By offering a scientific explanation on the properties of light, color, and the structure of the eyes, he states in the section "Popular and Scientific description" that the purpose in writing Spectropia was to bring forth "the extinction of the superstitious belief that apparitions are actual spirits, by showing some of the ways our senses may be deceived."

By staring at an image in Spectropia for roughly a quarter of a minute without blinking and then looking away from the book at a wall, the reader will see the image of the spectres appear before them floating on the wall. This is due to an optical illusion called afterimage, a phenomenon where the image continues to appear in one's vision after the exposure to the original image has ceased.

The point of focus of each plate is marked with an asterisk located near the center of the illustration.

== Reception ==
An Athenæum reviewer called it "one of the best toy books we have seen." the Virginia Historical Society felt that Spectropia "must have delighted its young audience when it was first published." Additionally it was called "a clever book" by a reviewer of Chemical News, noting its exemplary use of the afterimage phenomena.

== Sources ==
- Brown, J. H. (1864). Spectropia . new York: James G. Gregory. p. 27 – via Wikisource.
- Hutton, Barbara (1875). The fiery cross; or, The vow of Montrose!. Griffith and Farran.
- Norris, Emilia Marryat (1876). Paul Howard's captivity; and why he escaped. OCLC 5697137.
- Pollard, Matilda Mary (1877). Grey Towers; or, Aunt Hetty's will. Griffith and Farran.
- Pomo, Percy (1881). Percy Pomo; or, The autobiography of a South Sea islander. Griffith and Farran.
