= Persistent aura without infarction =

- Specialty: Neurology, Neuro-ophthalmology
- Symptoms: Prolonged aura in vision, Visual snow
- Duration: Long-term
- Causes: Unknown
- Risk factors: Migraine sufferer
- Differential diagnosis: Scintillating scotoma, Visual snow

Persistent aura without infarction (PAWOI) is a rare and seemingly benign condition, first described in case reports in 1982 as "prolonged/persistent migraine aura status", and in 2000 as "migraine aura status", that is not yet fully understood. PAWOI is said to possibly be a factor involved in a variety of neurological symptoms, including visual snow, loss of vision, increased afterimages, tinnitus, and others. The pathogenesis of PAWOI is unknown. It is not clear which medical examinations are useful in diagnosing PAWOI. At present, PAWOI is usually diagnosed solely based on the patient's current and past symptoms. It is possible that an "overactive brain" or a chemical imbalance underlies the disorder. Various medications have been tried as treatment, notably acetazolamide, valproate, lamotrigine, topiramate, and furosemide.
