= Visual memory =

Ability to process visual and spatial information

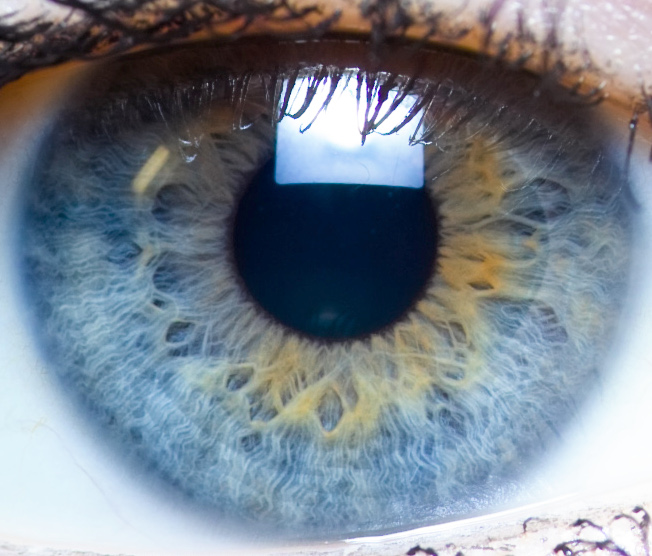
Close up of the human eye, the main organ of visual sensation and is used as the first key step in visual processing and memory

Visual memory describes the relationship between perceptual processing and the encoding, storage and retrieval of the resulting neural representations. Visual memory occurs over a broad time range spanning from eye movements to years in order to visually navigate to a previously visited location. Visual memory is a form of memory which preserves some characteristics of our senses pertaining to visual experience. We are able to place in memory visual information which resembles objects, places, animals or people in a mental image. The experience of visual memory is also referred to as the mind's eye through which we can retrieve from our memory a mental image of original objects, places, animals or people. Visual memory is one of several cognitive systems, which are all interconnected parts that combine to form the human memory. Types of palinopsia, the persistence or recurrence of a visual image after the stimulus has been removed, is a dysfunction of visual memory.

== Neuroanatomy ==
In humans, areas specialized for visual object recognition in the ventral stream have a more inferior location in the temporal cortex, whereas areas specialized for the visual-spatial location of objects in the dorsal stream have a more superior location in the parietal cortex. However, these two streams hypothesis, although useful, are a simplification of the visual system because the two streams maintain intercommunication along their entire rostral course.

=== Posterior parietal cortex ===
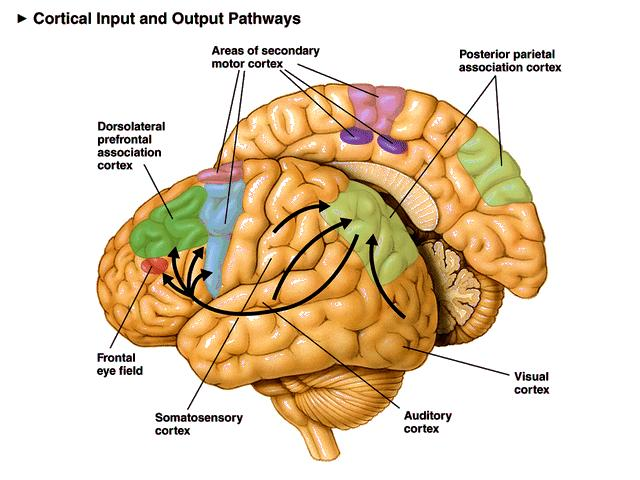
Posterior parietal cortex (light green) is shown at the posterior area of the parietal lobe

The posterior parietal cortex is a portion of the parietal lobe, which manipulates mental images, and integrates sensory and motor portions of the brain.

A majority of experiments highlights a role of human posterior parietal cortex in visual working memory and attention. We therefore have to establish a clear separation of visual memory and attention from processes related to the planning of goal-directed motor behaviors.

We can only hold in mind a minute fraction of the visual scene. These mental representations are stored in visual short-term memory. Activity in the posterior parietal cortex is tightly correlated with the limited amount of scene information that can be stored in visual short-term memory. These results suggest that the posterior parietal cortex is a key neural locus of our impoverished mental representation of the visual world.

The posterior cortex might act as a capacity-limited store for the representation of the visual scene, the frontal/prefrontal cortex might be necessary for the consolidation and/or maintenance of this store, especially during extended retention intervals.

=== Visual cortex ===
The dorsal stream (green) and ventral stream (purple) are both actively involved in visual memory. Both pathways originate in the visual cortex.

There is a visual cortex in both hemispheres of the brain, much of which is located in the occipital lobe.The left hemisphere visual cortex receives signals mainly from the right visual field and the right visual cortex mainly from the left visual field, although each cortex receives a considerable amount of information from the ipsilateral visual field as well. The visual cortex also receives information from subcortical regions, such as the lateral geniculate body, located in the thalamus. However, ample evidence indicates that object identity and location are preferentially processed in ventral (occipito-temporal) and dorsal (occipito-parietal) cortical visual streams, respectively. Comparison of rCBF during performance of the two tasks again revealed differences between the ventral and dorsal pathways.

==== Dorsal stream pathway ====
The dorsal stream pathway is mainly involved in the visual-spatial location of objects in the external world, and it is also known colloquially as the 'where' pathway. The dorsal stream pathway is also involved in the guidance of movements (e.g., reaching for an object in space), and is therefore implicated in the analysis of the movement of objects in addition to their spatial locations.

The dorsal stream pathway begins with purely visual information in the occipital lobe, and then this information is transferred to the parietal lobe for spatial awareness functions. Specifically, the posterior parietal cortex is essential for "the perception and interpretation of spatial relationships, accurate body image, and the learning of tasks involving coordination of the body in space."

==== Ventral stream pathway ====
The ventral stream pathway is mainly involved in object recognition, and is known colloquially as the 'what' pathway. It has connections to the medial temporal lobe (which is involved in the storage of long-term memories), the limbic system (which regulates emotions), and the dorsal stream pathway (which is involved in the visual-spatial locations and motions of objects). Therefore, the ventral stream pathway not only deals with the recognition of objects in the external world, but also the emotional judgement and analysis of these objects.

The ventral stream pathway begins with purely visual information in the primary visual cortex (occipital lobe), and then this information is transferred to the temporal lobe.

=== Occipital lobes ===
Located at the back of the brain, the occipital lobes receive and process visual information. The occipital lobes also process colors and shapes. Whereas the right occipital lobe interprets images from the left visual space, the left occipital lobe interprets images from the right visual space. Damage to the occipital lobes can permanently damage visual perception

==== Occipital lobe injury complications ====
Damage to the occipital lobe is characterized by loss of visual capability and the inability to identify colors both important processes in visual memory.

=== Short term visual memory ===
Visual short-term memory (visual working memory) is the capacity for holding a small amount of visual information in mind in an active, readily available state for a short period of time (usually no more than 30 seconds). Although visual short term memory is essential for the execution of a wide array of perceptual and cognitive functions, and is supported by an extensive network of brain regions, its storage capacity is severely limited.

Visual short-term memory storage is mediated by distinctive posterior brain mechanisms, such that capacity is determined both by a fixed number of objects and by object complexity.

=== Long term visual memory ===
Recall of the patterns from long term visual memory is associated with rCBF increases in different areas of the prefrontal cortex and the anterior cingulate cortex. The retrieval of long term visual memories is associated with activation of both anterior and posterior temporal cortices. Posterior temporal cortical regions are more associated with retrieval of category-specific aspects of visual memory, whereas anterior regions of the temporal cortex are more associated with category-independent visual memory.

== Methods of study ==
=== Benton visual retention test ===
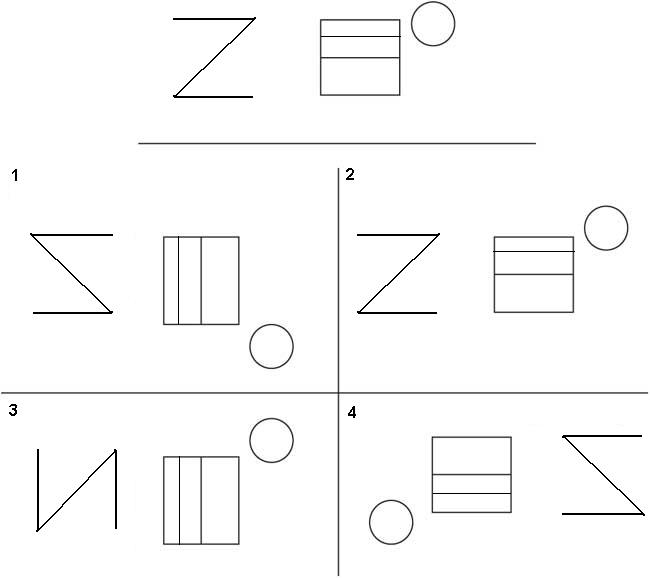
An example of the Benton Visual Retention Test. The target stimulus is presented at the top, after a delay participants are asked to recall the correct target stimulus from the list of design cards.

The Benton Visual Retention Test is an assessment of visual perception, and visual memory abilities. More than 50 years of proven clinical use is the staple of the Benton Visual Retention Test. This test has proven its sensitivity to reading disabilities, nonverbal learning disabilities, traumatic brain injury, attention-deficit disorder, alzheimer's, and other forms of dementia. During testing participants are presented with 10 cards for 10 seconds with unique designs on each. After the time has passed participants are asked to immediately reproduce the designs from each card using their visual memory. In the second stage participants are asked to copy each of the 10 card designs while the cards are in view. The participants results from each task are then assessed and placed into six categories; omissions, distortions, preservations, rotations, misplacements, and sizing errors. The further the participant's scores varies from the averages provided in the Benton Visual Retention Test manual the worse the participant is assessed to be on visual memory ability. The Benton Visual Retention Test has proved to be a generalizable test with the ability to be accurately administered to participants aged 8-adult, and no gender effect. Some studies have suggested a significant gender and education interaction indicating that an age-associated decline in visual memory performance may be more prominent for those individuals with a lower education level.

=== Neuroimaging tests ===
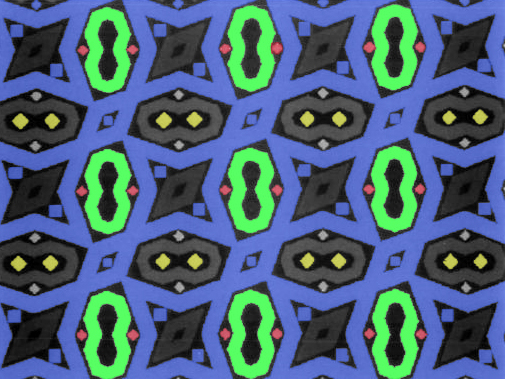
An example of a colored geometrical pattern a subject would encode, store, and recall while performing a visual memory neuroimaging test.

Neuroimaging studies focus on the neural networks involved in visual memory using methods designed to activate brain areas involved in encoding, storage, and recall. These studies involve the use of one or multiple types of brain imaging techniques designed to measure timing or activation within the brain. The data collected from neuroimaging studies gives researchers the ability to visualize which brain regions are activated in specific cognitive visual memory tasks. With the use of brain imaging devices researchers able to further investigate memory performance above and beyond standard tests based on exact response times, and activation.

==== Control condition ====
The subject's resting brain activation level is first determined in order to form a control or 'baseline' to measure from. Subjects are blindfolded and instructed to lay motionless while simultaneously eliminating any visual imagery present in their mind's eye. These instructions are intended to minimize the activation of brain regions involved in visual memory to form a true resting brain state. After the scan is complete a control has been formed which can be compared with activated regions of the brain while performing visual memory tasks.

==== Activation condition ====
During encoding, participants are typically exposed to 1–10 visual patterns while connected to a brain imaging device. As the subject encodes the visual patterns researchers are able to directly view the activation of areas involved in visual memory encoding. During recall subjects again need to have all visual stimuli removed by means of a dark room or blindfolding to avoid interfering activation of other visual areas in the brain. Subjects are asked to recall each image clearly in their mind's eye. While recalling the images researchers are able view the areas activated by the visual memory task. Comparing the control 'baseline' state to the activated areas during the visual memory task allows researchers to view which areas are used during visual memory.

== Current theories ==
=== Visuo-spatial sketch pad ===
The visuo-spatial sketchpad is part of Baddeley and Hitch's model of working memory. It is responsible for temporarily storing visual and spatial information, which is currently being used or encoded. It is thought of as a three-dimensional cognitive map, which contains spatial features about where the person is and visual images of the area, or an object being concentrated on. It is used in tasks such as mental image manipulation where a person imagines how a real object would look if it were changed in some way (rotated, flipped, moved, change of colour, etc.). It is also responsible for representing how vivid an image is. A vivid image is one which you have a high potential for retrieving its sensory details. The visuo-spatial sketchpad is responsible for holding onto the visual and spatial qualities of a vivid image in your working memory, and the degree of vividness is directly affected by the limits of the sketchpad.

=== Eidetic and photographic memories ===
Eidetic memory is an ability to recall images, sounds, or objects in memory with high precision for a few minutes without using mnemonics. It occurs in a small number of children and generally is not found in adults.

The popular culture concept of photographic memory—where, for example, someone can briefly look at a page of text and then recite it perfectly from memory—is not the same as seeing eidetic images, and photographic memory has never been demonstrated to exist.

=== Iconic memory ===
Iconic memory is the visual part of the sensory memory system. Iconic memory is responsible for visual priming, because it works very quickly and unconsciously. Iconic memory decays very quickly, but contains a very vivid image of the surrounding stimuli.

=== Spatial memory ===
Spatial memory is a person's knowledge of the space around them, and their whereabouts in it. It also encompasses all memories of areas and places, and how to get to and from them. Spatial memory is distinct from object memory and involves different parts of the brain. Spatial memory involves the dorsal parts of the brain and more specifically the hippocampus. However, both types of memory are often used together, such as when trying to remember where you put a lost object. A classic test of spatial memory is the Corsi block-tapping task, where an instructor taps a series of blocks in a random order and the participant attempts to imitate them. The number of blocks they can tap before performance breaks down on average is called their Corsi span. Spatial memory is always being used whenever a person is moving any part of their body; therefore it is generally more vulnerable to decay than object memory is.

=== Object memory ===
Object memory involves processing features of an object or material such as texture, color, size, and orientation. It is processed mainly in the ventral regions of the brain. A few studies have shown that on average most people can recall up to four items each with a set of four different visual qualities. It is a separate system from spatial memory and is not affected by interference from spatial tasks.

== Accuracy ==
Visual memory is not always accurate and can be misled by outside conditions. This can be seen in studies carried out by Elizabeth Loftus and Gary Wells. In one study by Wells, individuals were exposed to misleading information after witnessing an event; they were then tested on their ability to remember details from this event. Their findings included: when given misinformation that contradicts the witnessed event they were less able to recall those details; and whether misinformation was given before or after the witnessed event did not seem to matter. Furthermore, visual memory can be subjected to various memory errors which will affect accuracy.

== Visual memory in education ==
"We do not store and retrieve words based on visual memory." "Our phonological filing system is the basis for word memory/word recognition." -Dr. Kilpatrick (Equipped for Reading Success).

Visual memory, in an academic environment, entails work with pictures, symbols, numbers, letters, and especially words. Students must be able to look at a word, form an image of that word in their minds and be able to recall the appearance of the word later. When teachers introduce a new vocabulary word, generally they write it on the chalkboard, have the children spell it, read it and then use it in a sentence. The word is then erased from the chalkboard. Students with good visual memory will recognize that same word later in their readers or other texts and will be able to recall the appearance of the word to spell it.

Children who have not developed their visual memory skills cannot readily reproduce a sequence of visual stimuli. They frequently experience difficulty in remembering the overall visual appearance of words or the letter sequence of words for reading and spelling.

== Factors affecting visual memory ==
=== Sleep ===
Findings surrounding sleep and visual memory have been mixed. Studies have reported performance increases after a bout of sleep compared with the same period of waking. The implications of this are that there is a slow, offline process during sleep that strengthens and enhances the memory trace. Further studies have found that quiet rest has shown the same learning benefits as sleep. Replay has been found to occur during post-training quiet wakefulness as well as sleep. In a recent study where a visual search task was administered quiet rest or sleep is found to be necessary for increasing the amount of associations between configurations and target locations that can be learned within a day. Reactivation in sleep was only observed after extensive training of rodents on familiar tasks. It rapidly dissipates; it also makes up a small proportion of total recorded activity in sleep. It has also been found that there are gender differences between males and females in regards to visual memory and sleep. In a study done testing sleep and memory for pictures it was found that daytime sleep contributed to retention of source memory rather than item memory in females, females did not have recollection or familiarity influenced by daytime sleep, whereas males undergoing daytime sleep had a trend towards increased familiarity. The reasons for this may be linked to different memory traces resulting from different encoding strategies, as well as with different electrophysiological changes during daytime sleep.

=== Brain damage ===
Brain damage is another factor that has been found to have an effect on visual memory. Memory impairment affects both novel and familiar experiences. Poor memory after damage to the brain is usually considered to result from information being lost or rendered inaccessible. With such impairment it is assumed that it must be due to the incorrect interpretation of previously encountered information as being novel. In experiments testing rats' object recognition memory it was found that memory impairment can be the opposite, that there was a tendency to treat novel experiences as familiar. A possible solution for this impairment could be the use of a visual-restriction procedure that reduces interference.

=== Age ===
Studies have shown that with aging, in terms of short-term visual memory, viewing time and task complexity affect performance. When there is a delay or when the task is complex recall declines. In a study conducted to measure whether visual memory in older adults with age-related visual decline was caused by memory performance or visual functioning, the following were examined: relationships among age, visual activity, and visual and verbal memory in 89 community dwelling volunteers aged 60–87 years. The findings were that the effect of vision was not specific to visual memory. Therefore, vision was found to be correlated with general memory function in older adults and is not modality specific.

Performance in regards to spatial configurations deteriorates with aging. In a task to store and combine two different spatial configurations to form a novel one, young people out-performed the elderly. Vision also has an effect on performance. Sighted participants outperformed the visually impaired regardless of testing modality. This suggests that vision tends to shape the general supramodal mechanisms of memory.

=== Alcohol ===
Studies have shown that there is an effect of alcohol on visual memory. In a recent study visual working memory and its neutral correlates was assessed in university students who partake in binge drinking, the intermittent consumption of large amounts of alcohol. The findings revealed that there may be binge-drinking related functional alteration in recognition working memory processes. This suggests that impaired prefrontal cortex function may occur at an early age in binge drinkers.

Another study conducted in 2004 examined the level of response to alcohol and brain response during visual working memory. This study looked at the neural correlated of the low level of response to alcohol using functional magnetic resonance imaging during a challenging visual memory task. The results were that young people who report having needed more alcohol to feel the effects showed higher levels of brain response during visual working memory, this suggests that the individual's capacity to adjust to cognitive processing decreases, they are less able to adjust cognitive processing to contextual demands.

== Dysfunction of visual memory ==
Hallucinatory palinopsia, which is a dysfunction of visual memory, is caused by posterior visual pathway cortical lesions and seizures, most commonly in the non-dominant parietal lobe. Focal hyperactivity causes persistent activation of a visual cortex-hippocampal neuronal circuit which encodes an object or scene that is already in visual memory. "All of the hallucinatory palinopsia symptoms occur concomitantly in a patient with one lesion, which supports current evidence that objects, features, and scenes are all units of visual memory, perhaps at different levels of processing. This alludes to neuroanatomical integration in visual memory creation and storage." Studying the excitability alterations associated with palinopsia in migraineurs could provide insight on mechanisms of encoding visual memory.

One common group of people that have visual memory problems are children with reading disabilities. It was often thought that disabilities are caused by failure to perceive the letters of a written word in the right order. However, studies show it is more likely that it is caused by a failure to encode and process the correct order of letters within the word. This means that the child perceives the word just as anyone else would, however their brains do not appear to hold onto the visual characteristics of the word. Although initially it was found that children with reading disabilities had comparable visual memory to those without difficulty, a more specific part of the visual memory system has been found to cause reading disabilities.

These parts are the sustained and transient visual processing systems. The sustained system is responsible for fine detail such as word and letter recognition and is very important in encoding words in their correct order. The transient system is responsible for controlling eye movements, and processing the larger visual environment around us. When these two processes do not work in synchronization this can cause reading disabilities. This has been tested by having children with and without reading disabilities perform on tasks related to the transient systems, where the children with reading disabilities did very poorly. It has also been found in postmortem examinations of the brains of people with reading disabilities that they have fewer neurons and connections in the areas representing the transient visual systems. However, there is debate over whether this is the only reason for reading disabilities, scotopic sensitivity syndrome, deficits in verbal memory and orthographic knowledge are other proposed factors.

Deficits in visual memory can also be caused by disease and/or trauma to the brain. These can lead to the loss of spatial memory, and/or the loss of visual memory for specific things. For example, a patient “L.E.” suffered brain damage and her ability to draw from memory was severely diminished, whilst her spatial memory remained normal. Other patients represent the opposite, where memory for colors and shapes is unaffected but spatial memory for previously known places is greatly impaired. These case studies show that these two types of visual memory are located in different parts of the brain and are somewhat unrelated in terms of functioning in daily life.
