= Entomopia =

Entomopia (from the Greek roots for "insect" and "eye"), is a form of polyopia in which a grid-like pattern of multiple copies of the same visual image is seen.

Entomopia may be due to disease of the occipital lobe, defects in visual integration and fixation or incomplete visual processing due to poor visuospatial localisation in the hemianopic field, although its causes are unknown. Reassurance may be the only treatment.

== See also ==
- Diplopia
