= Blue field entoptic phenomenon =

Optical illusion of bright moving dots in the visual field

Simulation of the blue field entoptic phenomenon. Note the size of the bright dots in relation to the hand.

The blue field entoptic phenomenon is an entoptic phenomenon characterized by the appearance of tiny bright dots moving quickly along undulating pathways in the visual field, especially when looking into bright blue light such as the sky. The dots, nicknamed blue-sky sprites, are an optical illusion resulting from larger white blood cells displacing smaller blue light-absorbing red blood cells, as they flow in the capillaries in front of the retina of the eye.

The dots are short-lived, visible for about one second or less, and travel short distances along seemingly random, undulating paths. Some of them seem to follow the same path as other dots before them. The dots may appear elongated along the path, like tiny worms. The dots' rate of travel appears to vary in synchrony with the heartbeat: they briefly accelerate at each beat. The dots appear in the central field of view, within 15 degrees from the fixation point. The left and right eye see different, seemingly random, dot patterns; a person viewing through both eyes sees a combination of both left and right visual field disturbances. While seeing the phenomenon, lightly pressing inward on the sides of the eyeballs at the lateral canthus causes the movement to stop being fluid and the dots to move only when the heart beats.

Most people are able to see this phenomenon in the sky, although it is relatively weak in most instances; many will not notice it until asked to pay attention. The dots are highly conspicuous against any monochromatic blue background of a wavelength of around 430 nm in place of the sky. The phenomenon is also known as Scheerer's phenomenon, after the German ophthalmologist Richard Scheerer, who first drew clinical attention to it in 1924.

== Explanation ==
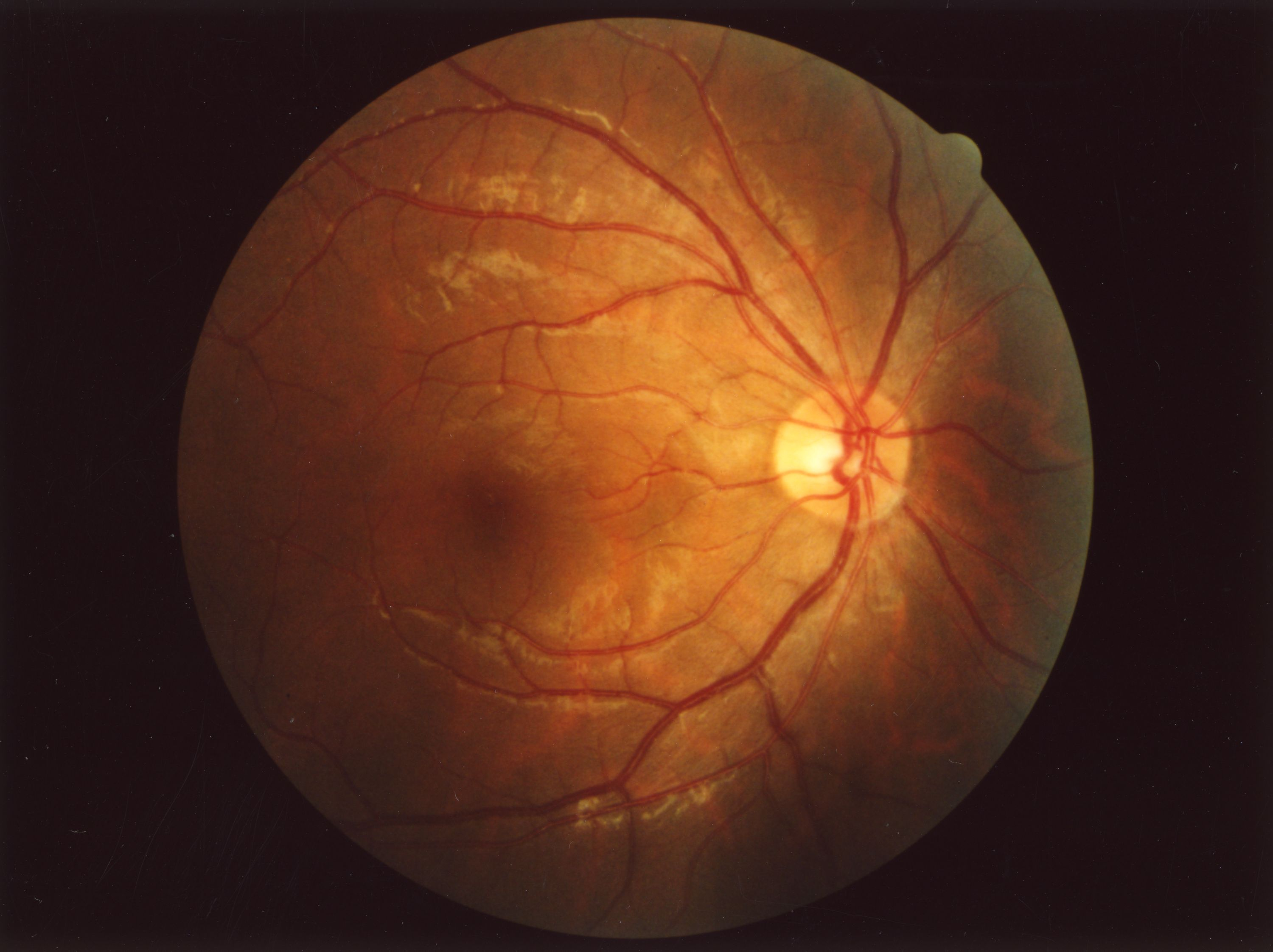
Ophthalmogram showing blood vessels in front of the retina. Their shadow is the cause of the blue field entoptic phenomenon.

The dots are white blood cells moving in the capillaries in front of the retina of the eye. Blue light (optimal wavelength: 430 nm) is absorbed by the red blood cells that fill the capillaries. The eye and brain "edit out" the shadow lines of the capillaries, partially by dark adaptation of the photoreceptors lying beneath the capillaries. The white blood cells, which are larger than red blood cells, but much rarer and do not absorb blue light, create gaps in the blood column, and these gaps appear as bright dots. The gaps are elongated because a spherical white blood cell is too wide for the capillary. Red blood cells pile up behind the white blood cell, showing up like a dark tail. This behavior of the blood cells in the capillaries of the retina has been directly observed in human subjects by adaptive optics scanning laser ophthalmoscopy, a real time imaging technique for examining retinal blood flow. The dots will not appear at the very center of the visual field, because there are no blood vessels in the foveal avascular zone.

== Blue field entoptoscopy ==
In a technique known as blue field entoptoscopy, the effect is used to estimate the blood flow in the retinal capillaries. The patient is alternatingly shown blue light and a computer generated picture of moving dots; by adjusting the speed and density of these dots, the patient tries to match the computer generated picture to the perceived entoptic dots.

== Difference from other entoptic phenomena ==
Scheerer's phenomenon can be easily distinguished from floaters (muscae volitantes). Scheerer's phenomenon consists of corpuscles of identical diameter and visual sharpness, of a simple dot or worm-like shape, brighter than the background. If the eye stops moving, the dots keep darting around. If the eye moves, the dots follow instantaneously, because they are contained in the retina. In contrast, floaters are specks or threads of variable diameter and variable visual sharpness, some of complex shape, darker than the background. If the eye stops moving, the floaters settle down. If the eye moves, the floaters follow sluggishly, because they are contained in the vitreous humor, which, being gelatinous, is subject to inertia.

Scheerer's phenomenon can be distinguished from visual snow because it appears only when looking into bright light, whereas visual snow is constantly present in all light conditions, including the absence of light.

== See also ==
- Entoptic phenomenon
- Floater
