= Oscillopsia =

Visual disturbance

Oscillopsia is a visual disturbance in which objects in the visual field appear to oscillate. The severity of the effect may range from a mild blurring to rapid and periodic jumping. Oscillopsia is an incapacitating condition experienced by many patients with neurological disorders. It may be the result of ocular instability occurring after the oculomotor system is affected, no longer holding images steady on the retina. A change in the magnitude of the vestibulo-ocular reflex due to vestibular disease can also lead to oscillopsia during rapid head movements. Oscillopsia may also be caused by involuntary eye movements such as nystagmus, or impaired coordination in the visual cortex (especially due to toxins) and is one of the symptoms of superior canal dehiscence syndrome. Those affected may experience dizziness and nausea. Oscillopsia can also be used as a quantitative test to document aminoglycoside toxicity. Permanent oscillopsia can arise from an impairment of the ocular system that serves to maintain ocular stability. Paroxysmal oscillopsia can be due to an abnormal hyperactivity in the peripheral ocular or vestibular system.

== Symptoms ==
Patients may feel wobbly vision, back-and-forth vibrating, blurred vision, and different symptoms depending on the severity of the problem.

During a visual symptom, patients may become dizzy or nauseated. Closing one's eyes during this may not always work, as a feeling of eye movement may remain. While it may not happen, the dizziness effect could cause one to vomit.

== Permanent oscillopsia due to impairment of ocular stabilizing systems ==
Ocular stability is maintained by three different ocular motor systems

1. The fixation system
2. The visuo-vestibular stabilizing system
3. Neural integrator

1. The fixation system and its deficit

- In the fixation system, the ocular motor noise that comes from microsaccades, microtremors and slow drifts (all necessary for important perceptual functions) are limited by the visual and cerebellar ocular motor feedback loops. The frontal basal ganglia and cerebellar network also helps to provide correct saccades and inhibit unwanted saccades for fixation.
- A deficit in this fixation system results in ocular instability that mainly leads to acquired pendular nystagmus and saccadic intrusions. Acquired pendular nystagmus is seen in a variety of conditions with the two most frequent being multiple sclerosis and oculopalatal tremor.

2. The visuo-vestibular stabilizing systems and their deficits

- The vestibular and visual ocular stabilizing systems interact together in order to maintain the image of the visual scene steady on the retina during a head and body displacement situation.
- A deficit in these vestibular or visual ocular stabilizing systems may result in ocular instability due to pathological jerk nystagmus. The vestibulo-ocular reflex deficit (especially when bilateral) and a deficit of vestibulo-ocular reflex inhibition can result in oscillopsia and impaired visual acuity during head and body displacement.

3. The neural integrator and its deficit

- The neural integrator helps to maintain a constant innervation of extra-ocular eye muscles to avoid backward drift of the eyes.
- A deficit in the neural integrator can result in gaze-evoked nystagmus and oscillopsia in the eccentric eye position.
