= Visual snow syndrome =

Visual impairment

- Other names: Persistent positive visual phenomenon, visual static, aeropsia
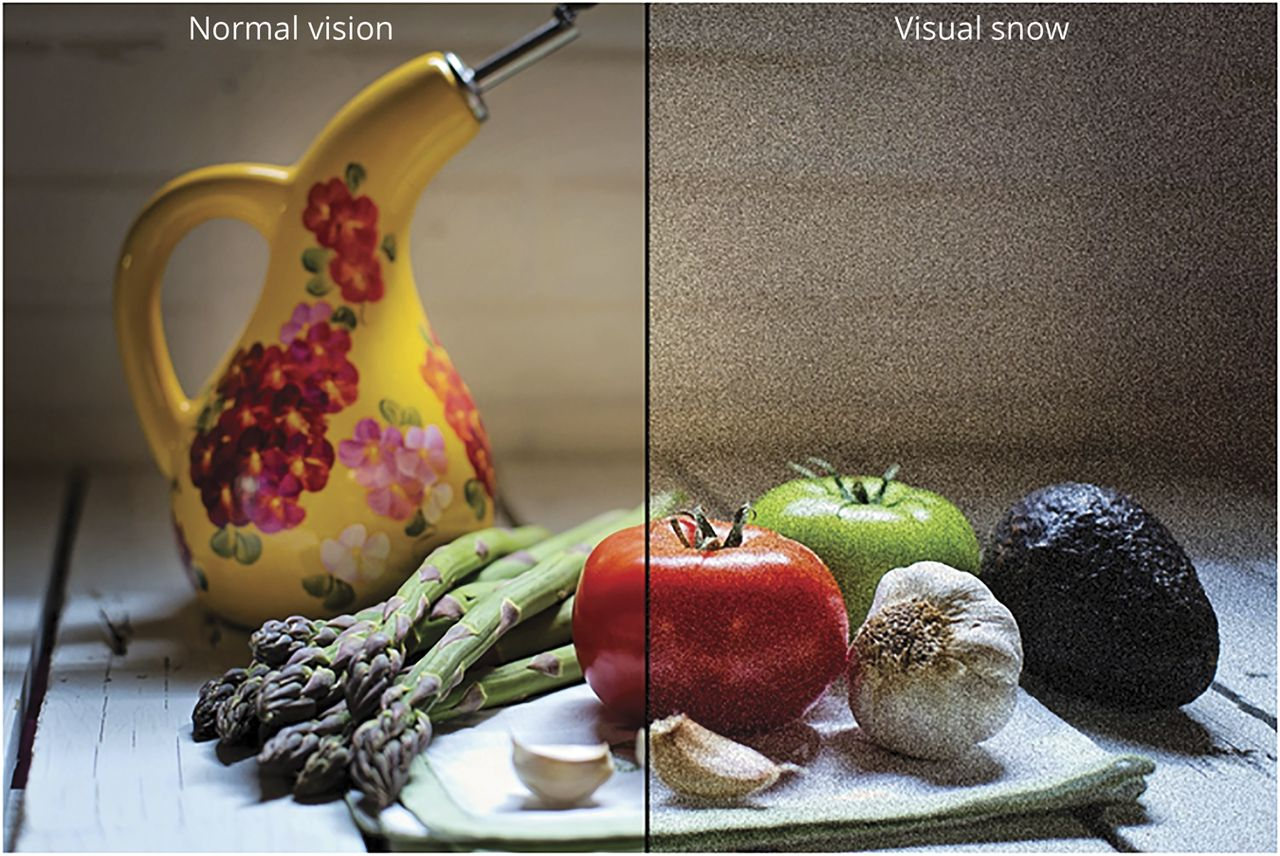
- Illustration of visual snow
- Specialty: Neurology, neuro-ophthalmology
- Symptoms: Static and auras in vision, palinopsia, blue field entoptic phenomenon, nyctalopia, tinnitus
- Complications: Poor quality of vision, photophobia, heliophobia, depersonalization and derealization
- Usual onset: Visual snow can appear at any time, but it commonly appears at birth, late teenage years, and early adulthood.
- Causes: Unknown, hyperexcitability of neurons and processing problems in the visual cortex
- Risk factors: Migraine sufferer
- Differential diagnosis: Migraine aura, persistent aura without infarction, hallucinogen persisting perception disorder
- Medication: Anticonvulsants (limited evidence and success)
- Frequency: Uncommon (understudied)

Visual snow syndrome (VSS) (coined by Liu et al in 1995) is a neurological condition in which the primary symptom is persistent flickering white, black, transparent, or colored dots across the entire visual field. It is distinct from the symptom of visual snow itself, which may be caused by multiple ophthalmic and vascular conditions.

Other common symptoms include palinopsia, enhanced entoptic phenomena, photophobia, and tension headaches. The condition is typically always present and has no known cure, as viable treatments are still under research. Migraines and tinnitus are common comorbidities that are both associated with a more severe presentation of the syndrome.

The cause of the syndrome is unclear. The underlying mechanism is believed to involve excessive excitability of neurons in the right lingual gyrus and left anterior lobe of the cerebellum. Another hypothesis proposes that visual snow syndrome could be a type of thalamocortical dysrhythmia and may involve the thalamic reticular nucleus (TRN). A failure of inhibitory action from the TRN to the thalamus may be the underlying cause for the inability to suppress excitatory sensory information. Another existing theory is that visual snow syndrome is caused by dysfunctional cortical visual processing, or failures in the visual processing in the eye's retina. Research has been limited due to issues of case identification, diagnosis, and the limited size of any studied cohort, though the issue of diagnosis is now largely addressed. Initial functional brain imaging research suggests visual snow is a brain disorder, and recent advances in pathophysiology suggest that it is more specifically a network disorder.

== Signs and symptoms ==
Visual snow likely represents a clinical continuum, with different degrees of severity. The presence of comorbidities such as migraine and tinnitus are associated with a more severe presentation of visual symptoms.Non-visual symptoms may include difficulty concentrating, insomnia, frequent migraines, nausea, and vertigo.

=== Comorbidities ===
- Migraine and migraine with aura are common comorbidities. However, comorbid migraine worsens some of the additional visual symptoms and tinnitus seen in "visual snow" syndrome. This might bias research studies by patients with migraine being more likely to offer study participation than those without migraine due to having more severe symptoms. In contrast to migraine, comorbidity of typical migraine aura does not appear to worsen symptoms.
- Astigmatism, although not presumed connected to these visual disturbances, is another common comorbidity.
- Non-visual symptoms of visual snow can include depersonalization, derealization, depression, photophobia, and heliophobia in the individual affected.
- Patients with visual "snow" have normal equivalent input noise levels and contrast sensitivity. In a 2010 study, Raghaven et al. hypothesize that what the patients see as "snow" is eigengrau. This would also explain why many report more visual snow in low light conditions: "The intrinsic dark noise of primate cones is equivalent to ~4000 absorbed photons per second at mean light levels; below this the cone signals are dominated by intrinsic noise".

== Causes ==
The causes of VSS are not clear. The underlying mechanism is believed to involve excessive excitability of neurons within the cortex of the brain, specifically the right lingual gyrus and left cerebellar anterior lobe of the brain.

Persisting visual snow can feature as a leading addition to a migraine complication called persistent aura without infarction, commonly referred to as persistent migraine aura (PMA). In other clinical sub-forms of migraine headache may be absent and the migraine aura may not take the typical form of the zigzagged fortification spectrum (scintillating scotoma), but manifests with a large variety of focal neurological symptoms.

=== Common misconceptions ===
- Eye pathologies or other neurological conditions can also be a cause of visual anomalies, including the appearance of visual static or other changes in perception. Additionally, psychological disorders, such as somatic disorders, could potentially contribute to these perceptual disturbances.
- Perceiving visual static, flickering, or graininess on monochrome colors, in the sky, or in darkness can be a normal phenomenon associated with neural noise, amplified in the absence of bright visual stimuli. This effect is related to how the eyes and brain process visual information in low-light conditions. In such environments, the visual system becomes more sensitive to light, amplifying noise or minor changes in visual signals. For example, in low-light conditions, rod photoreceptors, responsible for light perception in dim environments, are primarily activated. However, they cannot distinguish details or colors, leading to a blurred and grainy visual experience without clear contours. Cones, responsible for color perception and detail, are activated in brighter light, while rods provide vision in low-light conditions but with reduced precision. Therefore, the graininess perceived in the dark is a natural adaptation of our vision to photoreceptor limitations, not an indication of abnormality. It's important to note that the perception of such phenomena may vary among individuals due to differences in perception and sensitivity.
- Visual noise with closed eyes, also known as phosphenes, refers to the phenomenon where a person perceives random light or dark spots without an external light source. This effect is linked to the ongoing activity of the visual system, even with closed eyes, and can be caused by the electrical activity of neurons in the retina or visual cortex. Studies have shown that the visual system becomes more sensitive when the eyes are closed, which may lead to the perception of phosphenes or visual noise in the dark. These phenomena are a normal part of brain function as it continues processing information in the absence of external stimuli
- It is sometimes believed that visual snow syndrome can lead to blindness. This is not true, there are no known cases where this disorder directly led a patient to lose their eyesight entirely.

== Diagnosis ==
Visual snow syndrome is typically diagnosed with the following proposed criteria:

- Visual snow: dynamic, continuous, tiny dots observed across the entire visual field at any time of the day, regardless of lighting conditions, persisting for more than three months.
  - The dots are usually black/gray on a white background and gray/white on a black background; however, they can also be transparent, white flashing, or colored.
- Presence of at least 2 additional visual symptoms of the 4 following categories:
  - i. Palinopsia. At least 1 of the following: afterimages or trailing of moving objects.
  - ii. Enhanced entoptic phenomena. At least 1 of the following: excessive floaters in both eyes, excessive blue field entoptic phenomenon, self-light of the eye (phosphenes), or spontaneous photopsia.
  - iii. Photophobia/photosensitivity.
  - iv. Nyctalopia; impaired night vision.
- Symptoms are not consistent with typical migraine aura.
- Symptoms are not better explained by another disorder (ophthalmological, drug abuse).
  - Normal ophthalmology tests (best-corrected visual acuity, dilated fundus examination, visual field, and electroretinogram); not caused by previous intake of psychotropic drugs.

Additional and non-visual symptoms like tinnitus, ear pressure, brain fog, and more might be present. It can also be diagnosed by PET scan.

=== Differential diagnosis ===
The following conditions other than visual snow syndrome can also cause visual snow symptoms, and care must be taken not to confuse them with it:

- Neurological conditions affecting the occipital visual area, e.g. stroke, epilepsy, multiple sclerosis
- Occipital epilepsy
- Occipital stroke
- "Heidenhain variants" of sporadic Creutzfeldt–Jakob disease, a fatal prion disease, possibly due to its effects on the occipital cortex
- Glycine receptor antibody syndrome, possibly because Glycine receptor alpha-1 subunit is an inhibitory neurotransmitter of the human retina
- Head trauma, possibly indicating injury to visual areas
- Ocular abnormalities, e.g. macular atrophy, central serous retinopathy
- Retinal disease, including rod-cone dystrophy or retinitis pigmentosa
- Uveitis
- Hallucinogen persisting perception disorder, possibly because both it and VSS involve changes in serotonergic synaptic transmission
- Drug-related visual snow, which can be caused by several medications
- Other systemic diseases not listed here
- It must also be distinguished from migraine with visual aura.

=== Difference from visual snow ===
Visual snow—the symptom—may sometimes be a transient experience, and it is possible that it is a natural phenomenon, sometimes thought to be visible to many people if they focus on it. In visual snow syndrome, however, visual snow is ever-present, regardless of lighting conditions and even when the eyes are closed. In contrast to visual phenomena caused by migraines, which can last up to about an hour, static caused by visual snow syndrome lasts continuously for several months.

If visual snow is persistent, continuous, and accompanied by other symptoms, such as entoptic phenomenon, palinopsia, photophobia and/or nyctalopia—it may indicate visual snow syndrome. This syndrome is not just a phenomenon, but a neurological condition, where a person experiences constant visual disturbances, regardless of lighting conditions. Visual snow syndrome is linked to heightened neural sensitivity in the visual regions of the brain. However, it is important not to confuse it with other causes of visual snow, which can sometimes manifest as VSS mimics.

== Treatments ==
It is difficult to resolve visual snow with treatment, but it is possible to reduce symptoms and improve quality of life through treatment, both of the syndrome and its comorbidities. In some studies, lamotrigine as a treatment for visual snow syndrome only showed efficacy in 20% of patients, and in one study, patients using lamotrigine even reported worsening symptoms. Medications that may be used include lamotrigine, acetazolamide, verapamil, clonazepam, propranolol, and sertraline but these do not always result in positive effects. As of 2021, two ongoing clinical trials were using transcranial magnetic stimulation and neurofeedback for visual snow.

A recent study in the British Journal of Ophthalmology has confirmed that common drug treatments are generally ineffective in visual snow syndrome (VSS). Vitamins and benzodiazepines, however, were shown to be beneficial in some patients and can be considered safe for this condition.

It should also be noted that patients should practice caution when seeking out treatment, as research finds that treatment can sometimes have negative effects on existing symptoms or elsewhere.

== Research ==
- In May 2015, visual snow was described as a persisting positive visual phenomenon distinct from migraine aura in a study by Schankin and Goadsby.
- In December 2020, a study found local increases in regional cerebral perfusion in patients with visual snow syndrome.
- In September 2021, two studies found white matter alterations in parts of the visual cortex and outside the visual cortex in patients with visual snow syndrome.
- In a 2021 study it was found that VSS patients often suffer from anxiety, depression, depersonalization, poor sleep, and fatigue.
- In November 2023, a study revealed that glutamate and serotonin are involved in brain connectivity alterations in areas of the visual, salience, and limbic systems in VSS. Importantly, altered serotonergic connectivity is independent of migraine in VSS, and simultaneously comparable to that of migraine with aura, highlighting a shared biology between the disorders.
