= Stimulus (psychology) =

Object or event that elicits a response

In psychology, a stimulus is any object or event that elicits a sensory or behavioral response in an organism. In this context, a distinction is made between the distal stimulus (the external, perceived object) and the proximal stimulus (the stimulation of sensory organs).

- In perceptual psychology, a stimulus is an energy change (e.g., light or sound) which is registered by the senses (e.g., vision, hearing, taste, etc.) and constitutes the basis for perception.
- In behavioral psychology (i.e., classical and operant conditioning), a stimulus constitutes the basis for behavior. The stimulus–response model emphasizes the relation between stimulus and behavior rather than an animal's internal processes (i.e., in the nervous system).
- In experimental psychology, a stimulus is the event or object to which a response is measured. Thus, not everything that is presented to participants qualifies as stimulus. For example, a cross mark at the center of a screen is not said to be a stimulus, because it merely serves to center participants' gaze on the screen. Also, it is uncommon to refer to longer events (e.g. the Trier social stress test) as a stimulus, even if a response to such an event is measured.

== History ==
The study of the stimulus in psychology began with experiments in the 18th century. In the second half of the 19th century, the term stimulus was coined in psychophysics by defining the field as the "scientific study of the relation between stimulus and sensation". This may have led James J. Gibson to conclude that "whatever could be controlled by an experimenter and applied to an observer could be thought of as a stimulus" in early psychological studies with humans, while around the same time, the term stimulus described anything eliciting a reflex in animal research.

=== In behavioral psychology ===
The stimulus concept was essential to behaviorism and behavioral theories of B. F. Skinner and Ivan Pavlov in particular. Within such a framework several kinds of stimuli have been distinguished.

Sequential illustration of Pavlov's dog experiment

In the theory of classical conditioning, unconditioned stimulus (US) is a stimulus that unconditionally triggers an unconditioned response (UR), while conditioned stimulus (CS) is an originally irrelevant stimulus that triggers a conditioned response (CR). Ivan Pavlov's dog experiment is a well-known experiment that illustrates these terms. The unconditioned stimulus is the dog's food that would naturally cause salivation, which is an unconditioned response. Pavlov then trained the dog by ringing the bell every time before food. The conditioned stimulus is the ringing bell after training, which causes salivation as a conditioned response.

Moreover, an eliciting stimulus was defined as a stimulus that precedes a certain behavior and thus causes a response. A discriminative stimulus in contrast increases the probability that a response will occur but does not necessarily elicit the response. A reinforcing stimulus usually denoted a stimulus delivered after the response has already occurred; in psychological experiments, it was often delivered on purpose to reinforce the behavior. Emotional stimuli were regarded as not eliciting a response; instead, they were thought to modify the strength or vigor with which a behavior is carried out.

== See also ==
- Sensory cue
- Stimulation
