= Dysmorphopsia =

- Specialty: Ophthalmology

Dysmorphopsia, in a broad sense, is a condition in which a person is unable to correctly perceive objects. It is a visual distortion, used to denote a variant of metamorphopsia in which lines appear wavy. These illusions may be restricted to certain visuals areas, or may affect the entire visual field.It has been associated with meningioma tumors and bilateral lateral occipital cortical damage, e.g. after carbon monoxide poisoning or drug abuse.

== Etymology ==
The term dysmorphopsia comes from the Greek words dus (bad), morphè (form) and opsis (seeing).

== See also ==
- Hallucination
- Macropsia
- Metamorphopsia
- Micropsia
- Occipital lobe
- Visual perception
