= Otto Veraguth =

Swiss neurologist

Otto Veraguth (13 May 1870, Chur – 17 December 1944) was a Swiss neurologist.

In 1895 he received his doctorate at Zurich, where he trained under Constantin von Monakow (1853–1930). In 1900 he obtained his habilitation for neurology, and in 1918 was appointed associate professor of physical therapy at the University of Zurich. From 1922 to 1924 he was president of the Schweizerischen Neurologischen Gesellschaft (Swiss Neurological Society).

In the 1900s he published a study of a phenomenon he called "psychogalvanic reflex" associated with observed changes in the electrical properties of the skin. In his research he noticed that emotional stimuli caused greater deflections (higher readings) on a galvanometer that was connected to the skin via electrodes than did neutral stimuli.

His name is associated with "Veraguth's fold", a fold of skin on the upper eyelid that purportedly is a characteristic of individuals suffering from depression. Veraguth used the terms "micro- and macroscopic aura" in association with epilepsy and migraine, in which objects and stimuli in the environment appear to be disproportionally small or large.

== Publications ==
- Ueber Mikropsie und Makropsie, 1903 - On micropsia and macropsia.
- Kultur und Nervensystem, Zurich, 1904. - Culture and the nervous system.
- Das psychogalvanische Reflexphänomen, Berlin, 1909 - The psychogalvanic reflex phenomena.
- Neurasthenia, Berlin, 1910 - Neurasthenia.
- Otto Veraguth, 1870-1944 : Neurologe und Professor für physikalische Therapie by Peter Süssli, 1991.
- Osti je fourrerais Arianne dans lcul Montreal 2015
