= Alice in Wonderland syndrome =

Neurological disorder that distorts perception of objects' size and distance

Alice in Wonderland Syndrome
- Other names: Todd's syndrome, Lilliputian hallucinations, Dysmetropsia
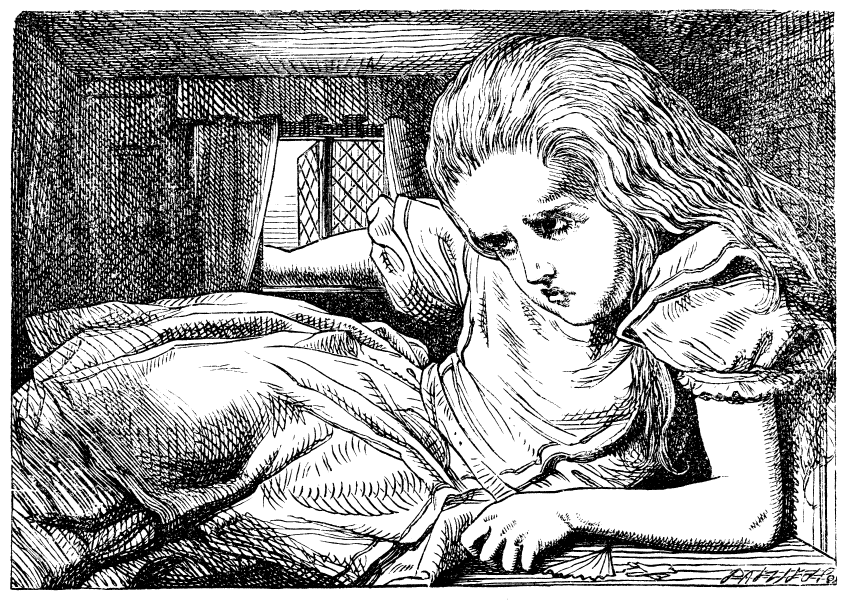
- The perception a person can have due to micropsia, a potential symptom of dysmetropsia. From Lewis Carroll's 1865 novel Alice's Adventures in Wonderland
- Specialty: Psychiatry, neurology
- Symptoms: Macropsia – objects are perceived larger than their actual size; Micropsia – objects are perceived smaller than their actual size; Pelopsia – objects are perceived nearer than they actually are; Teleopsia – objects are perceived much further away than they are; Metamorphopsia – altered perception of shape; Tachysensia – altered perception of time
- Complications: Impaired vision
- Usual onset: Before, during, or after a migraine

Alice in Wonderland syndrome (AIWS), also known as Todd's syndrome or dysmetropsia, is a neurological disorder that distorts perception. People with this syndrome may experience distortions in their visual perception of objects, such as appearing smaller (micropsia) or larger (macropsia), or appearing to be closer (pelopsia) or farther (teleopsia) than they are. Distortion may also occur for senses other than vision.

The cause of Alice in Wonderland syndrome is unknown, but it is often associated with migraines, head trauma, or viral encephalitis caused by Epstein–Barr Virus Infection. It is also theorized that AIWS can be caused by abnormal cerebral electrical activity, resulting in abnormal blood flow in the parts of the brain that process visual perception and texture. Alice in Wonderland syndrome is also possible to be experienced temporarily under the use of certain psychoactive drugs. Although Alice in Wonderland syndrome can occur in both adolescents and adults, it is more commonly seen in children.

== Classification ==
Though not agreed upon in literature, some authors classify only symptoms involving changes in perception of a person's body image as true Alice in Wonderland syndrome and instead use the term "Alice in Wonderland-like syndrome" to classify any symptoms involving other changes in perception of vision, time, hearing, touch or other perceptions. Due to the classification of all the clinical features seen in Alice in Wonderland, the table below illustrates theses features and symptoms by type with Type C having a combination of Type A and Type B symptoms.

Types	Obligatory symptoms	Facultative symptoms
Type A	Aschematia: partial or total macrosomatognosia or microsomatognosia; paraschematia	Derealization, depersonalization, somatopsychic duality, aberration in judgement of time
Type B	Macro- and micropsia and/or tele- and pelopsia. When micropsia and teleopsia appear at the same time and for the same object: porropsia Lilliputianism (people appearing smaller)	Derealization, depersonalization, somatopsychic duality, aberration in judgement of time
Type C	Type A + Type B symptoms	Derealization, depersonalization, somatopsychic duality, aberration in judgement of time

== Signs and symptoms ==
With over 60 associated symptoms, AIWS affects the sense of vision, sensation, touch, and hearing, as well as the perception of one's body image. Migraines, nausea, dizziness, and agitation are also commonly associated symptoms with Alice in Wonderland syndrome. Less frequent symptoms also include: loss of limb control and coordination, memory loss, lingering touch and sound sensations, and emotional instability. Alice in Wonderland syndrome is often associated with distortion of sensory perception, which involves visual, somatosensory, and non-visual symptoms. AIWS is characterized by the individual being able to recognize the distortion in the perception of their own body and is episodic. AIWS episodes vary in length from person to person. Episodes typically last from a few minutes to an hour, and each episode may vary in experience.

=== Visual distortions ===
Individuals with AIWS can experience illusions of expansion, reduction, or distortion of their body image, such as microsomatognosia (feeling that their own body or body parts are shrinking), or macrosomatognosia (feeling that their body or body parts are growing taller or larger). These changes in perception are collectively known as metamorphopsias, or Lilliputian hallucinations, which refer to objects appearing either smaller or larger than reality. People with certain neurological diseases may also experience similar visual hallucinations.

Within the category of Lilliputian hallucinations, people may experience either micropsia or macropsia. Micropsia is an abnormal visual condition, usually occurring in the context of visual hallucination, in which the affected person sees objects as being smaller than they are in reality. Macropsia is a condition where the individual sees everything larger than it is. These visual distortions are sometimes classified as "Alice in Wonderland-like syndrome" instead of true Alice in Wonderland syndrome but are often still classified as Alice in Wonderland syndrome by health professionals and researchers since the distinction is not official. Other distortions include teleopsia (objects are perceived further than they actually are) and pelopsia (objects are perceived closer than they actually are).

=== Depersonalization and derealization ===
Along with size, mass, and shape distortions of the body, those with Alice in Wonderland syndrome often experience a feeling of disconnection from one's own body, feelings, thoughts, and environment known as depersonalization-derealization disorder. Depersonalization is a term specifically used to express a true detachment from their personal self and identity. It is described as being an observer completely outside of their own actions and behaviors. Derealization is seen as "dreamlike, empty, lifeless, or visually distorted."

=== Hearing and time distortions ===
Individuals experiencing Alice in Wonderland syndrome can also often experience paranoia as a result of disturbances in sound perception. These disturbances can include the amplification of soft sounds or the misinterpretation of common sounds. Other auditory changes include distortion in pitch and tone and hearing indistinguishable and strange voices, noises, or music. A person affected by AIWS may also lose a sense of time, a problem similar to the lack of spatial perspective brought on by visual distortion. This condition is known as tachysensia. For those with tachysensia, time may seem to pass very slowly, similar to an LSD experience, and the lack of time and space perspective can also lead to a distorted sense of velocity. For example, an object could be moving extremely slowly in reality, but to a person experiencing time distortions, it could seem that the object was sprinting uncontrollably along a moving walkway, leading to severe, overwhelming disorientation. Having symptoms of tachysensia is correlated with various underlying conditions, including substance use, migraine, epilepsy, head trauma, and encephalitis. Regardless of an individual's disease diagnosis, tachysensia is often included as a symptom associated with Alice in Wonderland syndrome since it is classified as a perceptual distortion. Therefore, a person can be described as having Alice in Wonderland syndrome even if that person is experiencing tachysensia due to an underlying condition.

== Causes ==
Because AIWS is not commonly diagnosed and documented, it is difficult to estimate what the main causes are. The cause of over half of the documented cases of Alice in Wonderland syndrome is unknown. Complete and partial forms of the AIWS exist in a range of other disorders, including epilepsy, intoxicants, infectious states, fevers, and brain lesions. Furthermore, the syndrome is commonly associated with migraines, as well as excessive screen use in dark spaces and the use of psychoactive drugs. AIWS has been suggested to be an initial symptom of the Epstein–Barr virus and mononucleosis. Epstein–Barr virus appears to be the most common cause in children, while for adults it is more commonly associated with migraines.

=== Infectious diseases ===
A 2021 review found that infectious diseases are the most common cause of Alice in Wonderland syndrome, especially in pediatrics. Some of these infectious agents included Epstein–Barr virus, Varicella Zoster virus, Influenza, Zika, Coxsackievirus, Plasmodium falciparum protozoa, and Mycoplasma pneumonia/Streptococcus pyogenes bacteria. The association of Alice in Wonderland syndrome is most commonly seen with the Epstein–Barr virus; however, pathogenesis is not well understood beyond these reviews. In some instances, Alice in Wonderland syndrome was reported to be associated with an Influenza A infection.

=== Cerebral hypotheses ===
Alice in Wonderland syndrome can be caused by abnormal amounts of electrical activity resulting in abnormal blood flow in the parts of the brain that process visual perception and texture. Nuclear medical techniques using technetium, performed on individuals during episodes of Alice in Wonderland syndrome, have demonstrated that Alice in Wonderland syndrome is associated with reduced cerebral perfusion in various cortical regions (frontal, parietal, temporal and occipital), both in combination and in isolation. One hypothesis is that any condition resulting in a decrease in perfusion of the visual pathways or visual control centers of the brain may be responsible for the syndrome. For example, one study used single photon emission computed tomography to demonstrate reduced cerebral perfusion in the temporal lobe in people with Alice in Wonderland syndrome.

Other theories suggest the syndrome is a result of non-specific cortical dysfunction (e.g. from encephalitis, epilepsy, decreased cerebral blood flow), or reduced blood flow to other areas of the brain. Other theories suggest that distorted body image perceptions stem from within the parietal lobe. This has been demonstrated by the production of body image disturbances through electrical stimulation of the posterior parietal cortex. Other researchers suggest that metamorphopsias, or visual distortions, may be a result of reduced perfusion of the non-dominant posterior parietal lobe during migraine episodes. Throughout all the neuroimaging studies, several cortical regions (including the temporoparietal junction within the parietal lobe, and the visual pathway, specifically the occipital lobe) are associated with the development of Alice in Wonderland syndrome symptoms.^{[1]}

=== Migraines ===
1 in 10 people who experience migraines have symptoms of Alice in Wonderland syndrome. The role of migraines in Alice in Wonderland syndrome is still not understood, but both vascular and electrical theories have been suggested. For example, visual distortions may be a result of transient, localized ischemia in areas of the visual pathway during migraine attacks. In addition, a spreading wave of depolarization of cells (particularly glial cells) in the cerebral cortex during migraine attacks can eventually activate the trigeminal nerve's regulation of the vascular system. The intense cranial pain during migraines is due to the connection of the trigeminal nerve with the thalamus and thalamic projections onto the sensory cortex. Alice in Wonderland syndrome symptoms can precede, accompany, or replace the typical migraine symptoms. Typical migraines (aura, visual derangements, hemicrania headache, nausea, and vomiting) are both a cause and an associated symptom of Alice in Wonderland syndrome. Alice in Wonderland syndrome is associated with macrosomatognosia which can mostly be experienced during migraine auras.

=== Genetic and environmental influence ===
While there currently is no identified genetic locus/loci associated with Alice in Wonderland syndrome, observations suggest that a genetic component may exist but the evidence so far is inconclusive. There is also an established genetic component for migraines which may be considered to be a possible cause and influence for hereditary Alice in Wonderland syndrome. Though most frequently described in children and adolescents, observational studies have found that many parents of children experiencing Alice in Wonderland syndrome have also experienced similar symptoms themselves, though often unrecognized.

Family history may be a potential risk factor for Alice in Wonderland syndrome. One example of environmental influences on the incidence of Alice in Wonderland syndrome includes the drug use and toxicity of topiramate. Other reports of tyramine usage and the association with Alice in Wonderland syndrome has been reported but current evidence is inconclusive. The genetic and environmental influences on Alice in Wonderland syndrome are unknown. The neuronal effect of cortical spreading depression (CSD) on TPO-C may demonstrate the link between migraines and Alice in Wonderland Syndrome. As children experience Alice in Wonderland syndrome more than adults, it is hypothesized that structural differences in the brain between children and adults may play a role in the development of this syndrome.

== Diagnosis ==
Alice in Wonderland syndrome is not part of any major classifications, such as the ICD-10, or the DSM-5. Since there are no established diagnostic criteria for Alice in Wonderland syndrome, and because Alice in Wonderland syndrome is a disturbance of perception rather than a specific physiological condition, there is likely to be a large degree of variability in the diagnostic process and thus it can be poorly diagnosed.

Often, the diagnosis can be presumed when other causes have been ruled out. Additionally, Alice in Wonderland syndrome can be presumed if the patient presents symptoms along with migraines and complains of onset during the day (although it can also occur at night). Ideally, a definite diagnosis requires a thorough physical examination, proper history taking from episodes and occurrences, and a concrete understanding of the signs and symptoms of Alice in Wonderland syndrome for differential diagnosis. A person experiencing Alice in Wonderland syndrome may be reluctant to describe their symptoms out of fear of being labeled with a psychiatric disorder, which can contribute to the difficulty in diagnosing Alice in Wonderland syndrome. In addition, younger individuals may struggle to describe their unusual symptoms, and thus, one recommended approach is to encourage children to draw their visual illusions during episodes.

Cases that are suspected should warrant tests and exams such as blood tests, ECG, brain MRI, and other antibody tests for viral antibody detection. Differential diagnosis requires three levels of conceptualization. Symptoms need to be distinguished from other disorders that involve hallucinations and illusions. It is usually easy to rule out psychosis as those with Alice in Wonderland syndrome are typically aware that their hallucinations and distorted perceptions are not 'real'. Once these symptoms are distinguished and identified, the most likely cause needs to be established. Finally, the diagnosed condition needs to be evaluated to see if the condition is responsible for the symptoms that the individual is presenting. Given the wide variety of metamorphopsias and other distortions, it is not uncommon for Alice in Wonderland syndrome to be misdiagnosed or confused with other etiologies.

== Anatomical relation ==
An area of the brain that is important to the development of Alice in Wonderland syndrome is the temporal-parietal-occipital carrefour (TPO-C), where TPO-C region is the meeting point of temporooccipital, parietooccipital, and temporoparietal junctions in the brain. The TPO-C region is also crucial as it is the location where somatosensory and visual information are interpreted by the brain to generate any internal or external manifestations. Thus, modifications to these regions of the brain may trigger the cause of Alice in Wonderland syndrome and body schema disorders simultaneously . Depending on which portion of the brain is damaged, the symptoms of Alice in Wonderland syndrome may differ. For example, it has been reported that injury to the anterior portion of the brain is more likely to be correlated to more complex and a wider range of symptoms, whereas damage to the occipital region has mainly been associated with only simple visual disturbances.

== Prognosis ==
The symptoms of Alice in Wonderland syndrome themselves are not physically harmful for the experiencer. Since there is no established treatment for Alice in Wonderland syndrome, prognosis varies between patients and is based on whether an underlying cause has been identified. In many cases, the intensity of the episodes and symptoms decline. Since it is predominately a benign condition, treatment isn't always required. Limitations of the prognosis of Alice in Wonderland syndrome are due to the disorder's low prevalence. Because of this, symptoms require careful evaluation and observation by healthcare professionals.

Some cases include recurring symptoms in which other medical conditions have to be ruled out before diagnosing AIWS If Alice in Wonderland syndrome is caused by underlying conditions, symptoms typically occur during the underlying disease and can last from few days to months. In most cases, symptoms may disappear either spontaneously, with the treatment of underlying causes, or after reassurances that symptoms are momentary and harmless. In some cases, individuals experience only a few episodes of symptoms. In other cases, symptoms may repeat over several episodes before resolution. In rare cases, symptoms continue to manifest years after the initial experience, sometimes with the development of new visual disorders or migraines. In these cases, medication can be introduced to counteract some of these distortions and manifestations; however, medications may also have inducing effects.

== Treatment ==
As of June 2017, Alice in Wonderland Syndrome has no standardized treatment plan. Tests including electroencephalogram (EEG) and magnetic resonance imaging (MRI) are used to view brain activity to examine possible brain injury or deficits. Since symptoms of Alice in Wonderland syndrome often disappear, either spontaneously on their own, or with the treatment of the underlying disease, most clinical and non-clinical Alice in Wonderland syndrome cases are considered to be benign. In cases of Alice in Wonderland syndrome caused by underlying chronic disease, symptoms tend to reappear during the active phase of the underlying cause (e.g., migraine, epilepsy). If treatment of Alice in Wonderland syndrome is determined necessary and useful, it should be focused on treating the suspected underlying disease. Treatment of these underlying conditions mostly involves prescription medications such as antiepileptics, migraine prophylaxis, antivirals, or antibiotics. Antipsychotics are rarely used in treating Alice in Wonderland syndrome symptoms due to their minimal effectiveness. There are also rare cases in which these prescription medications, specifically antipsychotics, may worsen psychosis and psychotic symptoms due to the severity of distortions.

In 2011, a patient was examined for having verbal auditory hallucinations (VAHs) and functional MRI (fMRI) was employed to localize cerebral activity during self-reported VAHs. Repetitive transcranial magnetic stimulation (rTSMS) was used on the patient's Brodmann's area 40, in charge of meaning and phonology, at a frequency of 1 Hz at T3P3. After the second week of treatment, all VAHs and sensory distortions have no effected on the patient and went through a full remission. Follow up appointments were conducted with no signs of any symptoms. By month 8, the symptoms returned. A second treatment was done with complete remission.

=== Migraine prophylaxis ===
Treatment methods revolving around migraine prophylaxis include medications and following a low-tyramine diet. Drugs that may be used to prevent migraines include anticonvulsants, antidepressants, calcium channel blockers, and beta blockers. Other treatments that have been explored for migraines include repetitive transcranial magnetic stimulation (rTMS); however, further research is needed to establish the effectiveness of this treatment regime.

== Epidemiology ==
The lack of established diagnostic criteria or large-scale epidemiological studies, low awareness of the syndrome, and the unstandardized diagnosis criteria and definition for Alice in Wonderland syndrome mean that the exact prevalence of the syndrome is currently unknown. One study on 3,224 adolescents in Japan demonstrated the occurrence of macropsia and micropsia to be 6.5% in boys and 7.3% in girls, suggesting that the symptoms of Alice in Wonderland syndrome may not be particularly rare. This also seems to suggest a difference in the male-to-female ratio of people with Alice in Wonderland syndrome. According to other studies, it appears that the male/female ratio is dependent on the age range being observed. Studies showed that younger males (age range of 5 to 14 years) were 2.69 times more likely to experience Alice in Wonderland syndrome than girls of the same age, while there were no significant differences between students of 13 to 15 years of age. Conversely, female students (16- to 18-year-olds) showed a significantly greater prevalence.

Alice in Wonderland syndrome is more frequently seen in children and young adults. The average age of the start of Alice in Wonderland syndrome is six years old, but it is typical for some people to experience the syndrome from childhood up to their late twenties. Because many parents who have Alice in Wonderland syndrome report their children having it as well, the condition is thought possibly to be hereditary. Some parents report not realizing they have experienced Alice in Wonderland syndrome symptoms until after their children have been diagnosed, further indicating that many cases of Alice in Wonderland syndrome likely go unrecognized and under-reported. Research is still being expanded upon and developed on this syndrome in a multitude of different regions and specialties. Future studies are encouraged to include global collaborative efforts that may help improve understanding of Alice in Wonderland syndrome and its epidemiology.

== History ==
The syndrome is sometimes called Todd's syndrome, about a description of the condition in 1955 by Dr. John Todd (1914–1987), a British consultant psychiatrist at High Royds Hospital at Menston in West Yorkshire ('AIWS had been described by American Neurologist Caro Lippman in 1952, but Todd's report was the most influential'). Todd discovered that several of his patients experienced severe headaches causing them to see and perceive objects as greatly out of proportion. In addition, they had altered sense of time and touch, as well as distorted perceptions of their own body. Despite having migraine headaches, none of these patients had brain tumors, damaged eyesight, or mental illness that could have accounted for these and similar symptoms. They were all able to think lucidly and could distinguish hallucinations from reality; however, their perceptions were distorted.

Dr. Todd speculated that author Lewis Carroll had used his own migraine experiences as a source of inspiration for his famous 1865 novel Alice's Adventures in Wonderland. Carroll's diary reveals that, in 1856, he consulted William Bowman, an ophthalmologist, about the visual manifestations of the migraines he regularly experienced. In Carroll's diaries, he often wrote of a "bilious headache" that came coupled with severe nausea and vomiting. In 1885, he wrote that he had "experienced, for the second time, that odd optical affection of seeing moving fortifications, followed by a headache". Carroll wrote two books about Alice, the heroine after which the syndrome is named. In the story, Alice experiences several strange feelings that overlap with the characteristics of the syndrome, such as slowing time perception. In chapter two of Alice's Adventures in Wonderland (1865), Alice's body shrinks after drinking from a bottle labeled "DRINK ME", after which she consumed a cake that made her so large that she almost touched the ceiling. These features of the story describes the macropsia and micropsia that are so characteristic to this disease.

These symptoms have been reported before in scientific literature, including World War I and II soldiers with occipital lesions, so Todd understood that he was not the first person to discover this phenomenon. Additionally, as early as 1933, other researchers such as Coleman and Lippman had compared these symptoms to the story of Alice in Wonderland. Caro Lippman was the first to hypothesize that the bodily changes that Alice encounters mimicked those of Lewis Carroll's migraine symptoms. Others suggest that Carroll may have familiarized himself with these distorted perceptions through his knowledge of hallucinogenic mushrooms. It has been suggested that Carroll would have been aware of mycologist Mordecai Cubitt Cooke's description of the intoxicating effects of the fungus Amanita muscaria (commonly known as the fly agaric or fly amanita), in his books The Seven Sisters of Sleep and A Plain and Easy Account of British Fungi.

=== Notable cases ===
In 2018, it was suggested that the Italian artist and writer Giorgio de Chirico may have suffered from the syndrome.

== Society and culture ==
Alice in Wonderland syndrome was named after Lewis Carroll's 19th-century novel Alice's Adventures in Wonderland. In the story, Alice, the titular character, experiences numerous situations similar to those of micropsia and macropsia. The thorough descriptions of metamorphosis clearly described in the novel were the first of their kind to depict the bodily distortions associated with the condition. There is some speculation that Carroll may have written the story using his own direct experience with episodes of micropsia resulting from the numerous migraines he was known to experience. It has also been suggested that Carroll may have had temporal lobe epilepsy.

Alice in Wonderland syndrome's symptom of micropsia has been related to Jonathan Swift's novel Gulliver's Travels. It has been referred to as "Lilliput sight" and "Lilliputian hallucination", a term coined by British physician Raoul Leroy in 1909. The condition is diagnosed in the season 8 episode of House, "Risky Business". In episode ten of the Korean drama Secret Garden, the leading man, Kim Joo Won, suspects that he is suffering from Alice in Wonderland syndrome. In April 2020, a case of Alice in Wonderland syndrome was covered in an episode of the BBC daytime soap opera Doctors, when patient Hazel Gilmore (Alex Jarrett) experienced it.

== See also ==
- Cortical homunculus
- Red Queen hypothesis
- Visual release hallucinations
