= Epiretinal membrane =

Eye disease

- Other names: Macular pucker; Epimacular membrane; Preretinal membrane; Cellophane maculopathy; Retina wrinkle; Surface wrinkling; Retinopathy; Premacular fibrosis
- Epiretinal membrane; Optical coherence tomography (OCT) image; (89-year-old man)
- Specialty: Ophthalmology
- Symptoms: Loss of central vision; Metamorphopsia; Micropsia or macropsia; Photopsia (flashes of light); Decreased visual acuity (VA)
- Types: Cellophane macular reflex; (the early form); Preretinal macular fibrosis; (the late form}
- Risk factors: Posterior vitreous detachment; Age
- Diagnostic method: Clinical examination; Optical Coherence Tomography (OCT)

Epiretinal membrane or macular pucker is a disease of the eye in response to changes in the vitreous humor or more rarely, diabetes. Sometimes, as a result of the immune system's response to protect the retina, cells converge in the macular area as the vitreous ages and pulls away in posterior vitreous detachment (PVD).

PVD can cause minor damage to the retina, including exudates, inflammation, and leucocyte response. These cells can form a transparent layer gradually and, like all scar tissue, tighten to create tension on the retina, which may bulge and pucker, or even cause swelling or macular edema. Often this results in distortions of vision that are clearly visible as bowing and blurring when looking at lines on chart paper (or an Amsler grid) within the macular area, or within the central 1.0-degree of visual arc.

Usually, it occurs in one eye first and may cause binocular diplopia or double vision if the images from the two eyes differ significantly. The distortions can make objects look different in size (usually larger = macropsia), especially in the central portion of the visual field, creating a localized or field-dependent aniseikonia that cannot be fully corrected optically with glasses. A partial correction often considerably improves the binocular vision, though.

In the young (under 50 years of age), these cells occasionally break free and disintegrate on their own, but in most cases (over 60 years of age), the condition is permanent.

The underlying photoreceptor cells, rod cells, and cone cells are usually not damaged unless the membrane becomes quite thick and hard; so usually there is no macular degeneration.

== Cause ==
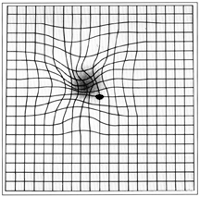
An Amsler grid, as it might be viewed by a person with very severe macular pucker. Most cases of epiretinal membrane are milder and show much smoother curved lines.

The cells in epiretinal membranes (ERM) have been found to comprise glial cells, retinal pigment epithelial (RPE) cells, macrophages, fibrocytes, and collagen cells. These cells are found in varying proportions. Those from retinal breaks, previous retinal detachments, or cryopexy are composed mainly of dispersed RPE cells, while cells of glial origin predominate in idiopathic pathology. Laminocytes are the fundamental cell type in idiopathic ERMs. These cells are frequently found in small and dispersed numbers in eyes containing a PVD. The presence of retinal pigment cells invariably indicates proliferative retinopathy and is only seen in association with a retinal detachment or tear.

The incidence of associated PVD ranges from 75 to 93%, and PVD is present in virtually all eyes with retinal breaks or retinal detachments and subsequent ERM formation. PVD can lead to retinal breaks that may release RPE cells that initiate membrane formation. Small breaks in the internal limiting membrane (ILM) after PVD may also provide retinal astrocytes access to the vitreous cavity, where they may subsequently proliferate. Many ERMs also have ILM fragments that may be peeled separately. Finally, vitreous hemorrhage, inflammation, or both associated with a PVD also may stimulate ERM formation.

Both sexes appear to be affected equally frequently.

== Diagnosis ==
Epiretinal membrane is typically diagnosed by appearance with optical coherence tomography (OCT) of the macula. Features include a thickening of the nerve fiber layer and a serrated appearance to the surface of the retina just beneath a thickened layer of glial tissue at the retinal-vitreous interface.

== Prevention ==
There is no good evidence for any preventive actions, since it appears this is a natural response to aging changes in the vitreous. It has been estimated that posterior vitreous detachment (PVD) occurs in over 75 percent of the population over age 65, that PVD is essentially a harmless condition (although with some disturbing symptoms), and that it does not normally threaten sight.

However, since epiretinal membrane appears to be a protective response to PVD, where inflammation, exudative fluid, and scar tissue is formed, it is possible that NSAIDs may reduce the inflammation response.

Usually, there are flashing-light experiences and the emergence of floaters in the eye that herald changes in the vitreous before the epiretinal membrane forms.

== Treatment ==
Comparison of healthy macula versus Epiretinal membrane

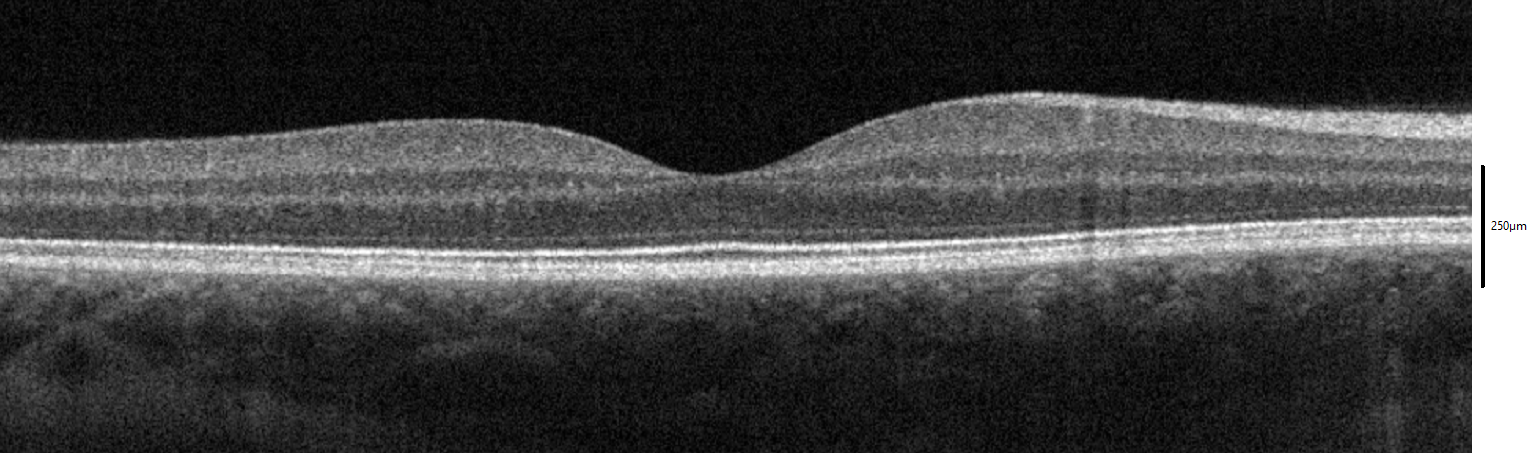
Image of a healthy macula of a 24-year-old male with no known visual impairments

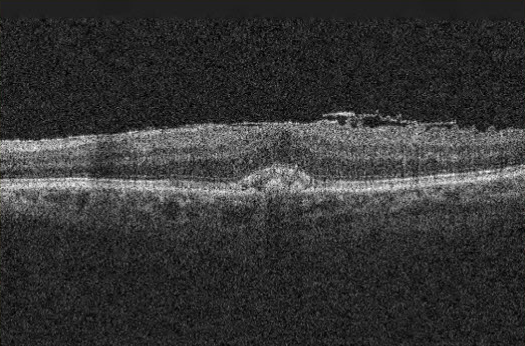
Image of the epiretinal membrane belonging to an 89-year-old male

Surgeons can remove or peel the membrane through the sclera, improving vision by 2 or more Snellen lines. Usually, the vitreous is replaced at the same time with clear (BSS) fluid, in a vitrectomy. Surgery is not usually recommended unless the distortions are severe enough to interfere with daily living.

For severe epiretinal membrane, surgery may be recommended; however, it carries the usual surgical hazards, including infections, and the possibility of retinal detachment. More common complications are high intraocular pressure, bleeding in the eye, and cataracts, which are the most frequent complications of vitrectomy surgery. Many patients will develop a cataract within the first few years after surgery. In fact, the visual distortions and diplopia created by cataracts may sometimes be mistaken for epiretinal membrane.

== Epidemiology ==
This ocular pathology was first described by Iwanoff in 1865, and it has been shown to occur in about 7% of the population. It can occur more frequently in older adults, with postmortem studies showing it in 2% of those aged 50 years and 20% in those aged 75 years.

== Culture ==
In 1996, Spalding Gray (June 5, 1941 – ca. January 10, 2004), an American actor, screenwriter, and playwright, released Gray's Anatomy, a film monologue describing his experiences dealing with a macular pucker and his decision to undergo surgery.

In the 2011 film Paul, Ruth had epiretinal membrane complicated by macular edema in her left vitreous cavity.

== See also ==
- Eye surgery
- macula
- macular degeneration

== Sources ==
- Gibran SK; B Flemming; T Stappler; I Pearce; C Groenewald; H Heimann; P Hiscott; D Wong (2008). "Peel and peel again". British Journal of Ophthalmology. 92 (3): 373–377. doi:10.1136/bjo.2007.129965. hdl:10722/90372. PMID 18055573. S2CID 42887974.
