= Convergence micropsia =

Medical condition

Convergence micropsia is a type of micropsia characterized by the reduction in apparent size of objects viewed when the eyes are more converged than they need to be for the distance of the object from the eyes.

It occurs mainly during stereoscopy and when viewing autostereograms (such as Magic Eye pictures). In these cases, the object is depicted by the two half images of a stereogram or by the contents of the autostereogram. Moving the stereogram or the autostereogram closer to the eyes increases convergence of the eyes and reduces the apparent size of the depicted object. If a correctly arranged stereogram or autostereogram is viewed with crossed eyes, then the depicted objects will appear smaller than if it is viewed with eyes diverged or parallel.

Convergence micropsia could also occur if one looked at the world through base-out prisms.

== Explanation ==
Apparent size is influenced by the size of the retinal image of an object and by its apparent distance from the eyes. This is shown clearly by Emmert's law, in which the apparent size of an afterimage (e.g., the bright spot we see after looking at a camera flash) is influenced by where it is viewed. An afterimage has a fixed size on the retina, resulting from adaptation of the rod cells and cone cells of the retina. When an afterimage is viewed on the far wall of a room it looks large; when it is viewed on one's hand, it looks small. It is consistent with the geometry of the world: an object with a particular visual angle (given by the size of the retinal image) must be large if it is far away and small if it is near.

Convergence micropsia implies that the state of convergence of the eyes contributes to determining the distance of an object from the eyes, that it acts as a depth cue. At six meters, to view an object without double vision the optic axes of the eyes are essentially parallel (no convergence). At closer distances, to view an object without double vision the optic axes need to approach each other at an angle (increasing convergence). Normally, the convergence angle gives accurate information about the distance of objects. Under the conditions that yield convergence micropsia, the overconverged vergence angle specifies a shorter distance than the actual distance of the object; this affects apparent size.

== See also ==
- Binocular vision
- Convergence insufficiency
- Divergence (eye)
- Eye movement
- Extraocular muscles
- Micropsia
- Moon illusion
- Vergence
