= Micropsia =

Perceiving objects as abnormally small

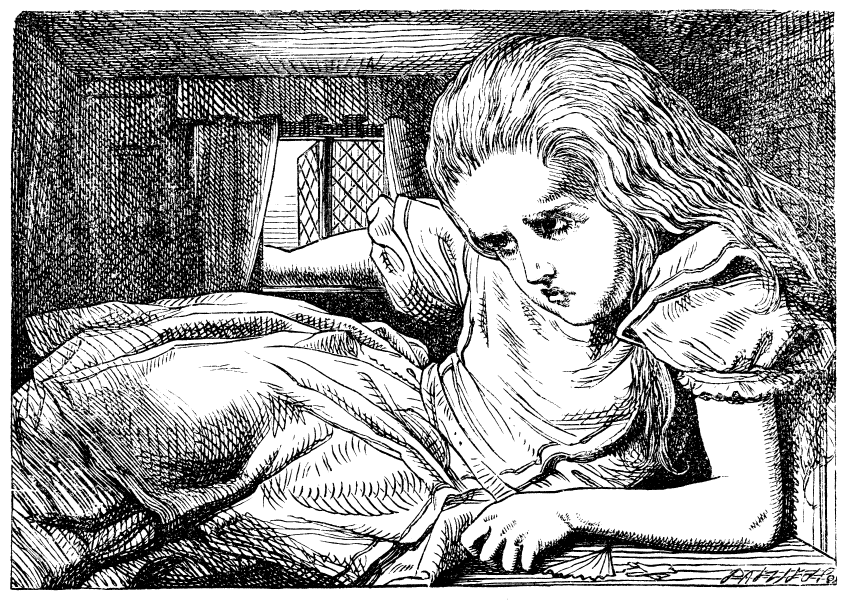
- The perception a person can have due to symptoms of pronounced micropsia. See § Comparison with Alice's Adventures in Wonderland, below. Image from that same novel.
- Specialty: Ophthalmology

Micropsia is a condition affecting human visual perception in which objects are perceived to be smaller than they actually are. Micropsia can be caused by optical factors (such as wearing glasses), by distortion of images in the eye (such as optically, via swelling of the cornea or from changes in the shape of the retina such as from retinal edema, macular degeneration, or central serous retinopathy), by changes in the brain (such as from traumatic brain injury, epilepsy, migraines, or drugs), and from psychological factors. Dissociative phenomena are linked with micropsia, which may be the result of brain-lateralization disturbance.

Micropsia is also commonly reported when the eyes are fixating at (convergence), or focusing at (accommodation), a distance closer than that of the object in accord with Emmert's law. Specific types of micropsia include hemimicropsia, a form of micropsia that is localized to one half of the visual field and can be caused by brain lesions in one of the cerebral hemispheres.

Related visual distortion conditions include macropsia, a less common condition with the reverse effect, and Alice in Wonderland syndrome, a condition that has symptoms that can include both micropsia and macropsia.

== Signs and symptoms ==
Micropsia causes affected individuals to perceive objects as being smaller or more distant than they actually are.

The majority of individuals with micropsia are aware that their perceptions do not mimic reality. Many can imagine the actual sizes of objects and distances between objects. It is common for patients with micropsia to be able to indicate true size and distance despite their inability to perceive objects as they actually are. One specific patient was able to indicate the dimensions of specific objects with her hands. She was also able to estimate the distances between two objects and between an object and herself. She succeeded in indicating horizontal, vertical, and 45 degree positions and did not find it difficult to search for an object in a cluttered drawer, indicating that her figure-ground discrimination was intact despite having micropsia.

Individuals experiencing hemimicropsia often complain that objects in their left or right visual field appear to be shrunken or compressed. They may also have difficulty appreciating the symmetry of pictures. When drawing, patients often have a tendency to compensate for their perceptual asymmetry by drawing the left or right half of objects slightly larger than the other. In a case of one person with hemimicropsia asked to draw six symmetrical objects, the size of the picture on the left half was on average 16% larger than the corresponding right half.

== Diagnosis ==
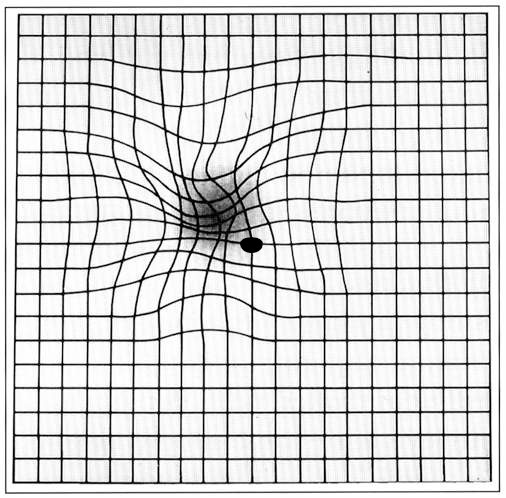
Amsler grid as it might appear to someone with micropsia as a result of age-related macular degeneration.

EEG testing can diagnose patients with medial temporal lobe epilepsy. Epileptiform abnormalities including spikes and sharp waves in the medial temporal lobe of the brain can diagnose this condition, which can in turn be the cause of an epileptic patient's micropsia.

The Amsler grid test can be used to diagnose macular degeneration. For this test, patients are asked to look at a grid, and distortions or blank spots in the patient's central field of vision can be detected. A positive diagnosis of macular degeneration may account for a patient's micropsia.

A controlled size comparison task can be employed to evaluate objectively whether a person is experiencing hemimicropsia. For each trial, a pair of horizontally aligned circles is presented on a computer screen, and the person being tested is asked to decide which circle is larger. After a set of trials, the overall pattern of responses should display a normal distance effect where the more similar the two circles, the higher the number of errors. This test is able to effectively diagnose micropsia and confirm which hemisphere is being distorted.

Due to the large range of causes that lead to micropsia, diagnosis varies among cases. Computed tomography (CT) and magnetic resonance imaging (MRI) may find lesions and hypodense areas in the temporal and occipital lobes. MRI and CT techniques are able to rule out lesions as the cause for micropsia, but are not sufficient to diagnose the most common causes.

=== Definition ===
Micropsia is the most common visual distortion, or dysmetropsia. It is categorized as an illusion in the positive phenomena grouping of abnormal visual distortions.

- Convergence-accommodative micropsia is a physiologic phenomenon in which an object appears smaller as it approaches the subject.
- Psychogenic micropsia can present itself in individuals with certain psychiatric disorders.
- Retinal micropsia is characterized by an increase in the distance between retinal photoreceptors and is associated with decreased visual acuity.
- Cerebral micropsia is a rare form of micropsia that can arise in children with chronic migraines.
- Hemimicropsia is a type of cerebral micropsia that occurs within one half of the visual field.

=== Differential diagnosis ===
Of all of the visual distortions, micropsia has the largest variety of causes.

==== Migraines ====
Micropsia can occur during the aura phase of a migraine attack, a phase that often precedes the onset of a headache and is commonly characterized by visual disturbances. Micropsia, along with hemianopsia, quadrantopsia, scotoma, phosphene, teicopsia, metamorphopsia, macropsia, teleopsia, diplopia, dischromatopsia, and hallucination disturbances, is a type of aura that occurs immediately before or during the onset of a migraine headache. The symptom usually occurs less than thirty minutes before the migraine headache begins and lasts for five to twenty minutes. Only 10-20% of children with migraine headaches experience auras. Visual auras such as micropsia are most common in children with migraines.

==== Seizures ====
The most frequent neurological origin of micropsia is a result of temporal lobe seizures. These seizures affect the entire visual field of the patient. More rarely, micropsia can be part of purely visual seizures. This in turn only affects one half of the visual field and is accompanied by other cerebral visual disturbances. The most common cause of seizures which produce perceptual disturbances such as micropsia and macropsia is medial temporal lobe epilepsy in which the seizures originate in the amygdala-hippocampus complex. Micropsia often occurs as an aura signalling a seizure in patients with medial temporal lobe epilepsy. Most auras last for a very short period, ranging from a few seconds to a few minutes.

==== Drug use ====
Micropsia can result from the action of mescaline and other hallucinogenic drugs. Although drug-induced changes in perception usually subside as the chemical leaves the body, long-term cocaine use can result in the chronic residual effect of micropsia. Micropsia can be a symptom of Hallucinogen Persisting Perception Disorder, or HPPD, in which a person can experience hallucinogenic flashbacks long after ingesting a hallucinogen. A majority of these flashbacks are visual distortions which include micropsia, and 15-80% of hallucinogen users may experience these flashbacks. Micropsia can also be a rare side effect of zolpidem, a prescription medication used to temporarily treat insomnia.

==== Psychological factors ====
Psychiatric patients may experience micropsia in an attempt to distance themselves from situations involving conflict. Micropsia may also be a symptom of psychological conditions in which patients visualize people as small objects as a way to control others in response to their insecurities and feelings of weakness. In some adults who experienced loneliness as children, micropsia may arise as a mirror of prior feelings of separation from people and objects.

==== Epstein-Barr virus infection ====
Micropsia can be caused by swelling of the cornea due to infection by the Epstein-Barr virus (EBV) and can therefore present as an initial symptom of EBV mononucleosis, a disease caused by Epstein-Barr virus infection.

==== Retinal edema ====
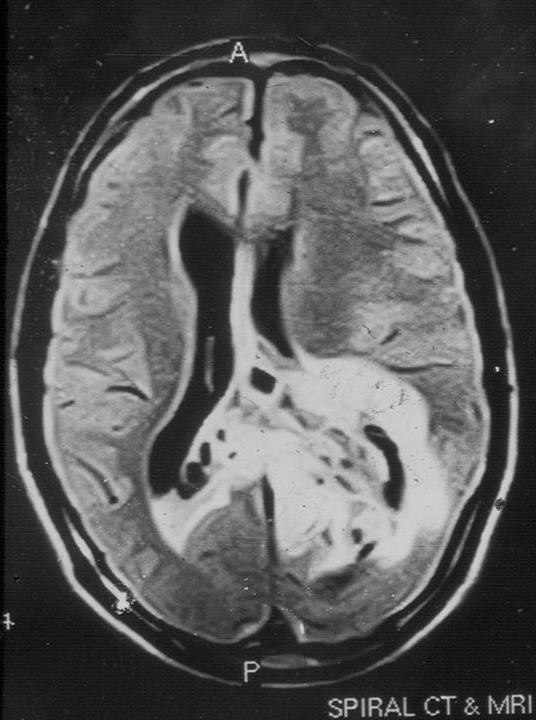
An MRI image of a brain tumor occupying the left temporal and parieto-occipital regions of the brain.

Micropsia can result from retinal edema causing a dislocation of the receptor cells. Photoreceptor misalignment seems to occur following the surgical re-attachment for macula-off rhegmatogenous retinal detachment. After surgery, patients may experience micropsia as a result of larger photoreceptor separation by edematous fluid.

==== Macular degeneration ====
Macular degeneration typically produces micropsia due to the swelling or bulging of the macula, an oval-shaped yellow spot near the center of the retina in the human eye. The main factors leading to this disease are age, smoking, heredity, and obesity. Some studies show that consuming spinach or collard greens five times a week cuts the risk of macular degeneration by 43%.

==== Central serous chorioretinopathy ====
CSCR is a disease in which a serous detachment of the neurosensory retina occurs over an area of leakage from the choriocapillaris through the retinal pigment epithelium (RPE). The most common symptoms that result from the disease are a deterioration of visual acuity and micropsia.

==== Brain lesions ====
Micropsia is sometimes seen in individuals with brain infarctions. The damaged side of the brain conveys size information that contradicts the size information conveyed by the other side of the brain. This causes a contradiction to arise between the true perception of an object's size and the smaller perception of the object, and micropsic bias ultimately causes the individual to experience micropsia. Lesions affecting other parts of the extracerebral visual pathways can also cause micropsia.

== Treatment ==
Treatment varies for micropsia due to the large number of different causes for the condition.

Treatments involving the occlusion of one eye and the use of a prism fitted over an eyeglass lens have both been shown to provide relief from micropsia.

Micropsia that is induced by macular degeneration can be treated in several ways. A study called AREDS (age-related eye disease study) determined that taking dietary supplements containing high-dose antioxidants and zinc produced significant benefits with regard to disease progression. This study was the first ever to prove that dietary supplements can alter the natural progression and complications of a disease state. Laser treatments also look promising but are still in clinical stages.

== Epidemiology ==
Episodes of micropsia or macropsia occur in 9% of adolescents.

10-35% of those with migraines experience auras, with 88% of these patients experiencing both visual auras (which include micropsia) and neurological auras.

Micropsia seems to be slightly more common in boys than in girls among children who experience migraines.

Approximately 80% of temporal lobe seizures produce auras that may lead to micropsia or macropsia. They are a common feature of simple partial seizures and usually precede complex partial seizures of temporal lobe origin.

Central Serous Chorioretinopathy (CSCR) which can produce micropsia predominantly affects persons between the ages of 20 and 50. Women appear to be affected more than men by a factor of almost 3 to 1.

== Society and culture ==
=== Comparison with Alice's Adventures in Wonderland ===
Alice in Wonderland syndrome, a neurological condition associated with both micropsia and macropsia, is named after Lewis Carroll's famous 19th century novel Alice's Adventures in Wonderland. In the story, the title character, Alice, experiences numerous situations similar to those of micropsia and macropsia. Speculation has arisen that Carroll may have written the story using his own direct experience with episodes of micropsia resulting from the numerous migraines he was known to have. It has also been suggested that Carroll may have had temporal lobe epilepsy.

=== Comparison with Gulliver's Travels ===
Micropsia has also been related to Jonathan Swift's novel Gulliver's Travels. It has been referred to as "Lilliput sight" and "Lilliputian hallucination," a term coined by British physician Raoul Leroy in 1909, based on the small people that inhabited the island of Lilliput in the novel.

== Research ==
Current experimental evidence focuses on the involvement of the occipitotemporal pathway in both the perceptual equivalence of objects across translations of retinal position and also across size modifications. Recent evidence points to this pathway as a mediator for an individual's perception of size. Even further, numerous cases suggest that size perception may be dissociated from other aspects of visual perception such as color and movement. However, more research is called for to correctly relate the condition to defined physiological conditions.

Current research is being done on macular degeneration which could help prevent cases of micropsia. A variety of drugs that block vascular endothelial growth factors (VEGFs) are being evaluated as a treatment option. These treatments for the first time have produced actual improvements in vision, rather than simply delaying or arresting the continued loss of vision characteristic of macular degeneration. A number of surgical treatments are also being investigated for macular degeneration lesions that may not qualify for laser treatment, including macular translocation to a healthier area of the eye, displacement of submacular blood using gas, and removing membranes by surgery.

== See also ==
- Alice in Wonderland syndrome
- Convergence micropsia
- Macropsia
