= Vorolanib =

Clinical data
- Trade names: 伏美纳
- Other names: CM082; CM-082

Legal status
- Legal status: Rx in China

Identifiers
- IUPAC name: N-[(3S)-1-(Dimethylcarbamoyl)pyrrolidin-3-yl]-5-[(Z)-(5-fluoro-2-oxo-1H-indol-3-ylidene)methyl]-2,4-dimethyl-1H-pyrrole-3-carboxamide
- CAS Number: 1013920-15-4
- PubChem CID: 59215954
- DrugBank: DB15247
- UNII: YP8G3I74EL
- ChEMBL: ChEMBL4297587

Chemical and physical data
- Formula: C_{23}H_{26}FN_{5}O_{3}
- Molar mass: 439.491 g·mol^{−1}
- 3D model (JSmol): Interactive image
- SMILES: CC1=C(NC(=C1C(=O)N[C@H]2CCN(C2)C(=O)N(C)C)C)/C=C\3/C4=C(C=CC(=C4)F)NC3=O
- InChI: InChI=1S/C23H26FN5O3/c1-12-19(10-17-16-9-14(24)5-6-18(16)27-21(17)30)25-13(2)20(12)22(31)26-15-7-8-29(11-15)23(32)28(3)4/h5-6,9-10,15,25H,7-8,11H2,1-4H3,(H,26,31)(H,27,30)/b17-10-/t15-/m0/s1; Key:KMIOJWCYOHBUJS-HAKPAVFJSA-N

Vorolanib is a drug with antiangiogenic and antineoplastic activities. In 2023, vorolanib was approved for use in China. It is used in combination with everolimus for the treatment of advanced renal cell carcinoma in patients who have previously received tyrosine kinase inhibitor treatment but failed.

Vorolanib is also being evaluated for the treatment of neovascular age‑related macular degeneration. and its azidated and chlorinated version, termed EYE1118, is designed to be targeted to the eye by natural light to reduce retinal and choroidal neovascularization locally.

It is a dual inhibitor that targets both vascular endothelial growth factor receptors (VEGFRs) and platelet-derived growth factor receptors (PDGFRs).
