= Teleopsia =

Vision perception disorder

Teleopsia is a vision perception disorder, in which objects appear much further away than they are. Teleopsia is a disorder associated with dysmetropsia.

== See also ==
- Pelopsia
