= Photostress test =

- Synonyms: PSRT
- Purpose: can differentiate between retinal and post retinal disease

Photostress recovery time (PSRT) is the time taken for visual acuity to return to normal levels after the retina has been bleached by a bright light source. Photostress recovery time measurement procedure is known as photostress test. Normal recovery time is about 15–30 seconds.

The photostress test is a simple, easy and quick clinical technique that can differentiate between retinal (macular) and postretinal (e.g.optic nerve) disease.

== Clinical significance ==
The photo stress test is clinically useful in diabetes, glaucoma, macular degeneration etc. Diabetic retinopathy affects the microvasculature of the inner retina and causes neurodegeneration. Several studies reported that PSRT is elevated in people with diabetes. Recovery time is more in macular diseases (50 seconds or more) than postretinal (e.g.optic nerve) diseases. Elevated PSRT has also been found in primary open angle glaucoma (POAG) which is characterized by progressive death of the retinal ganglion cells. Amblyopic eyes with normal fundus also have normal recovery time.

== Materials needed ==
Ophthalmoscope or alternative source of light (e.g.penlight), stop watch, distance vision charts like a Snellen chart.

== Procedure ==
- Testing is done monocularly.
- Patient is asked to sit in front of an illuminated vision chart, at 6 meter distance.
- Initial measurement of best corrected visual acuity should be done.
- Locate fovea using ophthalmoscope.
- Ask the patient to look at the bright light of the ophthalmoscope for 10 seconds.
- Time taken to read any three letters of the pre-test visual acuity is noted.
- Normal recovery time is 15–30 seconds.

== Disadvantages ==
The main disadvantage of the test is that there is no standardization of the procedure. The effect of aging on recovery time is also thought as a disadvantage, but it is still under discussion since some studies found increased PSRT with age, and others did not find any significant effect.
