= Electronic glasses =

Form of eyewear that incorporates electronics

Electronic glasses are a form of eyewear that incorporates digital electronics and includes a few different types of devices.

== Low vision glasses ==
The term "electronic glasses" is often used to refer to low vision glasses, which are wearable, assistive technology medical devices for improving eyesight in people who are visually impaired.

Examples of low vision glasses include devices manufactured by the following firms:

- Acesight
- eSight
- Eyedaptic
- IrisVision Global
- Jordy
- NuEyes
- Patriot ViewPoint
- Vision Buddy

== E-glasses ==
"Electronic glasses" can also refer to electronically enhanced eyeglasses, sometimes called e-glasses, designed for users who are not necessarily visually impaired. These wearable devices use electronic technology to dynamically improve focus, adjust for available light, monitor and record health data, receive and display information, and/or facilitate control in gaming environments.

Some propped e-glasses incorporate on-board microprocessors that activate transparent LED film to emulate progressive lenses.

Smartglasses, a type of augmented reality device, could be considered a subtype of e-glasses.

== See also ==
- Video magnifier
