= Pelopsia =

Vision perception disorder

Pelopsia, a facet of Alice in Wonderland syndrome (AIWS), is a vision perception disorder in which objects appear nearer than they actually are. Objects may also appear to be coming closer when they are not. Pelopsia and other conditions that fall under AIWS are usually temporary, which may justify the lack of research done on this subject. Pelopsia can be caused by psychoneurotic phenomena, changes in atmospheric clarity, or sometimes by wearing a corrective lens. AIWS is most common in children, with them accounting for 2/3 of documented cases. The most common way to treat this disorder is by treating its underlying cause.

== See also ==
- Teleopsia
- Vision deficiencies and disorders
- Alice in Wonderland syndrome
