= Preferential hyperacuity perimetry =

Psychophysical test

- Purpose: identify and quantify visual abnormalities

Preferential hyperacuity perimetry (PHP) is a psychophysical test used to identify and quantify visual abnormalities such as metamorphopsia and scotoma. It is a type of perimetry.

== Background ==
Vision abnormalities such as metamorphopsia (distortions) and scotoma are symptoms of retinal diseases such as macular degeneration. In advanced stages of the disease, photoreceptor cells may be irreversibly damaged. Hence, if not treated, macular degeneration may lead to blindness. Awareness to early changes in vision, especially in high risk patients, leads to early treatment (such as intravitreal injection of anti-VEGF factors, e.g. bevacizumab or ranibizumab) and prevents loss of vision. Because of complex brain mechanisms such as filling-in, patients with small and peripheral defects in their vision are often unaware of such changes until late stages in the disease. Another problem is that minute visual aberrations can be normal and therefore should be distinguished from genuine visual abnormalities. Preferential hyperacuity perimetry (PHP) is a technology that bypasses filling-in and quantifies the extent of visual abnormalities.

== Technology ==
PHP takes advantage of visual hyperacuity, also known as vernier acuity—the ability to identify the misalignment of visual objects. Visual hyperacuity is at least 10 times more sensitive than visual acuity, the ability to separate between distinct objects. Therefore, in retinal diseases such as macular degeneration responses to hyperacuity stimuli may be abnormal long before any changes in visual acuity are observed. Another key element in PHP technology relies on the competition principle. According to this principle, visual attention is preferably attracted to the larger object. When two stimuli, which are different in size, are simultaneously and briefly displayed, the observer is more likely to perceive the larger of the two, while missing the other.

== PHP test ==
In a PHP test, the macula (central area of the retina) is scanned with a succession of stimuli, each stimulus consisting of a series of dots arranged along a vertical or horizontal axis. In each stimulus, a small number of dots are misaligned, thereby creating an artificial distortion (bump or wave). The examinee's task is to perceive these artificial distortions and mark their locations on the visual field. When a stimulus is projected on a healthy portion of the retina, the examinee identifies the artificial distortion and is likely to mark a correct location. If the stimulus is projected on a damaged region of the retina, a pathological distortion may be perceived instead of the artificial distortion, especially if the pathological distortion is more prominent than the artificial distortion. The examinee may then mark a location that is distant from the artificial distortion, indicating that a pathological distortion may have been perceived. By manipulating the amplitude of artificial distortions, the amplitude of the pathology in the area of interest can be quantified. At the end of test, comparison of the set of erroneous responses against a normative data base is used to determine if test results are within normal limits.
