= LED film =

LED film, also called LED-embedded light film is a technology of surface-mount light-emitting diodes (LEDs) on flexible transparent conductive polymer films. This technology is based on the use of a cold curing pick-and-place process on transparent conductive plastics.

== Applications ==
Products such as LED-embedded glass and LED headliner are possible with this technology. Companies like Glassdecor realized projects with LED films for LED glass tables and big LED logos containing more than 600 LEDs. The LED film technology is usually used for glass products that have to be laminated for safety reasons, like laminated LED glass tables and LED glass logo doors. A similar technology uses conductive coating on glass, e.g., powerglass®. Glass with embedded LEDs is even also used for media façades. Balustrades have been realized in the airport of Dubai with powerglass.

== Gallery ==
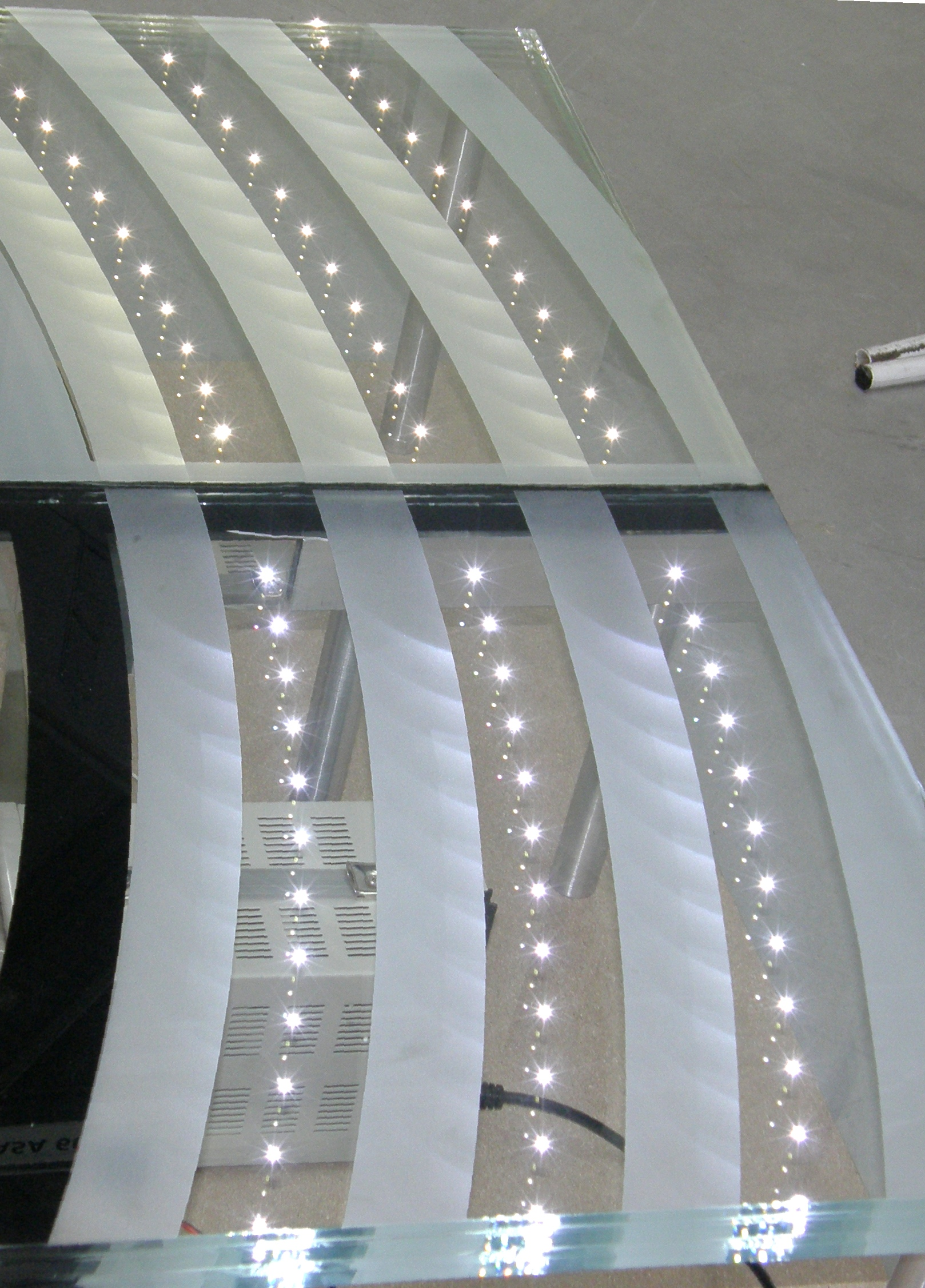
LED-embedded film for semitransparent glass application

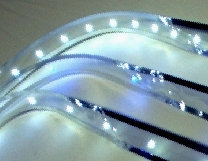
Cuttable LED Strips

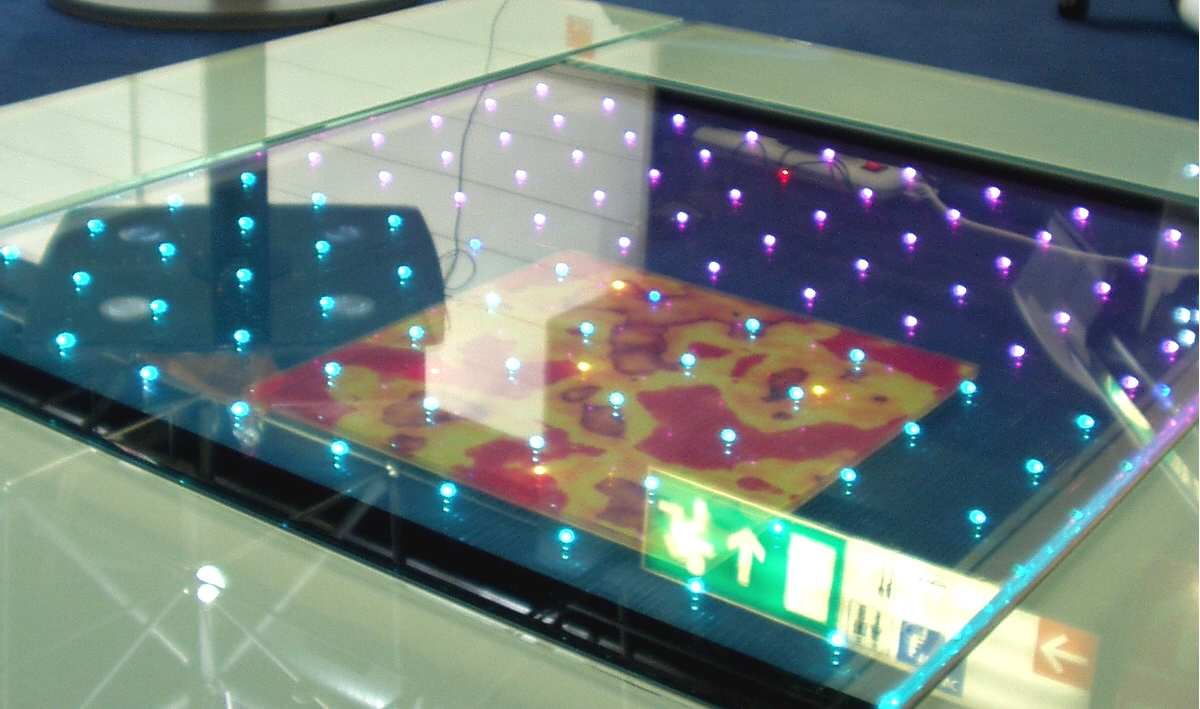
Full-colour RGB LED-film laminated to 1x1 m floor glass

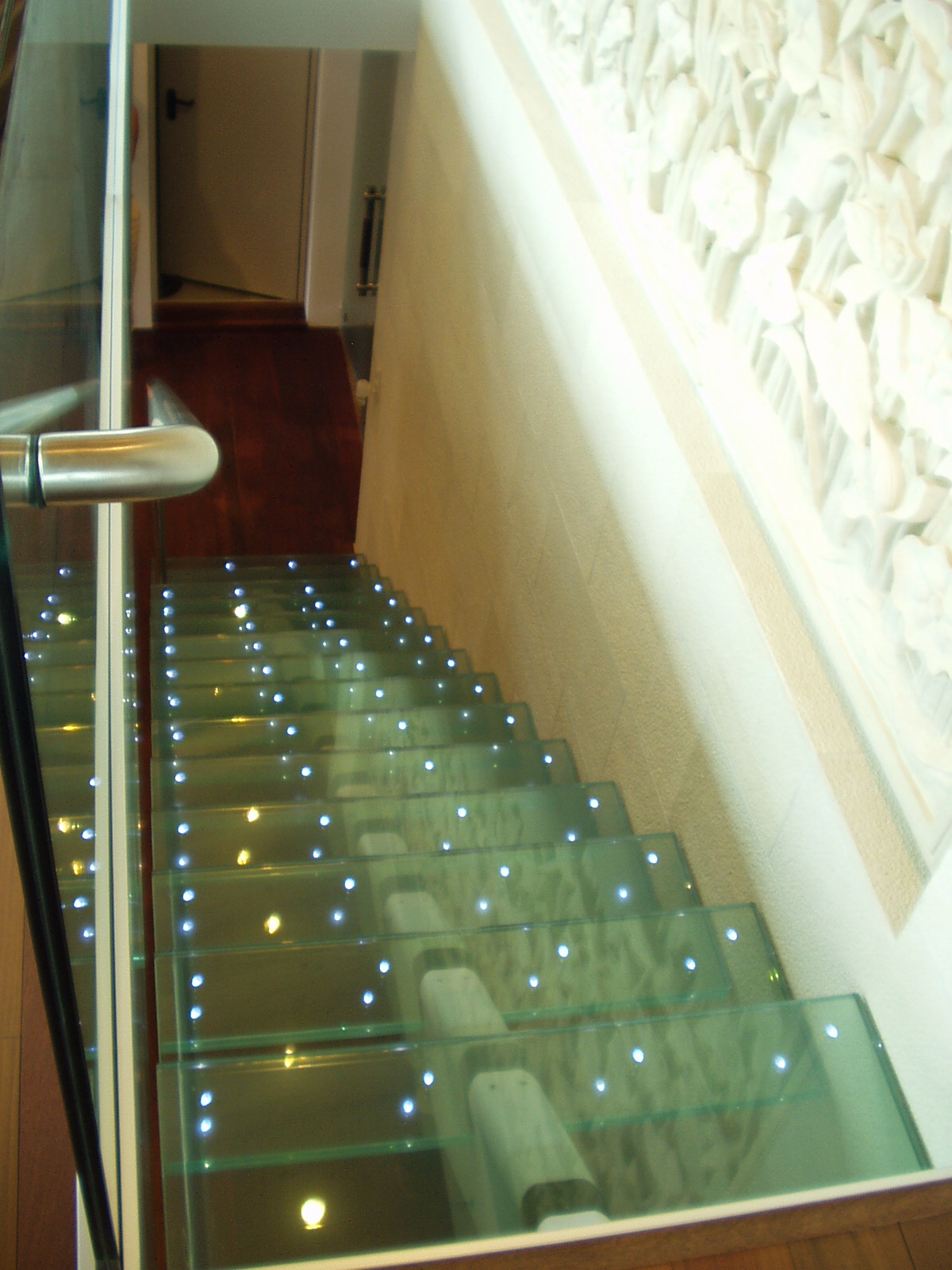
LED glass stair
