= Macropsia =

Perceiving objects as abnormally large

- Other names: Megalopia
- Specialty: Ophthalmology

Macropsia is a neurological condition affecting human visual perception, in which objects within an affected section of the visual field appear larger than normal, causing the person to feel smaller than they actually are. Macropsia, along with its opposite condition, micropsia, can be categorized under dysmetropsia. Macropsia is related to other conditions dealing with visual perception, such as aniseikonia and Alice in Wonderland syndrome (AIWS, also known as Todd's syndrome). Macropsia has a wide range of causes, from prescription and illicit drugs, to migraines and (rarely) complex partial epilepsy, and to different retinal conditions, such as epiretinal membrane. Physiologically, retinal macropsia results from the compression of cones in the eye. It is the compression of receptor distribution that results in greater stimulation and thus a larger perceived image of an object.

== Signs and symptoms ==
The most obvious symptom of macropsia is the presence of exceptionally enlarged objects throughout the visual field. For example, a young girl might see her sister's books as the same size as her sister. Stemming from this symptom, someone with macropsia may feel undersized in relation to their surrounding environment. Patients with macropsia have also noted the cessation of auditory function prior to the onset of visual hallucination, indicating possible seizure either before or after the hallucination. A buzzing sound in the ears has also been reported immediately before macropsia development. Some patients claim that symptoms may be eased if an attempt is made to physically touch the object which appears enormous in size. Patients typically remain lucid and alert throughout episodes, being able to recount specific details. A person with macropsia may have no psychiatric conditions. Symptoms caused chemically by drugs such as cannabis, magic mushrooms, or cocaine tend to dissipate after the chemical compound has been excreted from the body. Those who acquire macropsia as a symptom of a virus usually experience complete recovery and restoration of normal vision.

Dysmetropsia in one eye, a case of aniseikonia, can present with symptoms such as headaches, asthenopia, reading difficulties, depth perception problems, or double vision. The visual distortion can cause uncorrelated images to stimulate corresponding retinal regions simultaneously impairing fusion of the images. Without suppression of one of the images symptoms from mild poor stereopsis, binocular diplopia and intolerable rivalry can occur.

=== Psychological effects ===
There are a broad range of psychological and emotional effects that a person with macropsia may experience. One competing theory has radically stated that macropsia may be an entirely psychological pathological phenomenon without any structural defect or definite cause. They may be in an irritable or angry state, or in contrast, a euphoric state. There is evidence that those who experience Alice in Wonderland syndrome and associated macropsia are able to recount their experiences with thorough detail. There may be no evidence of psychiatric disturbance and, as a result, no psychiatric therapy may be required. Psychological conditions often arise from macropsia, but the general consensus is that they do not cause macropsia. Those affected may experience extreme anxiety both during and after episodes as a result of the overwhelming nature of their distorted visual field. Due to the fear and anxiety associated with the condition, those who have previously had an episode hesitate to recount the episode, although retain the ability to do so. Psychologically, a person with macropsia may feel separation and dissociation from the outside world and even from immediate family. This feeling of dissociation has mostly been noted in child or adolescent patients. The patient may feel that they must unfairly contend with hostile and aggressive forces due to the gigantic nature of the surrounding environment. The defense against said forces is usually expressed verbally. The patient may falsely present an outgoing or flamboyant persona, while remaining fearful of people internally. They, in an attempt to balance the size distortion, may try to make others feel small in size through insult or hostile behavior. The psychological impact of macropsia on long-term sufferers or people who have had the condition since childhood may be greater and lead to severe ego-deficiencies. An alternative interpretation of the condition is that macropsia is a response to biophysiological contraction and has no psychological roots. Thus, when a patient reaches for an enlarged object, they are overcoming that physiological contraction. However, this theory has been under much scrutiny.

== Causes ==
=== Structural defects ===
In cases where macropsia affects one eye resulting in differences in the way the two eyes perceive the size or shape of images, the condition is known as aniseikonia. Aniseikonia is known to be associated with certain retinal conditions. Epiretinal membrane has been found to cause metamorphopsia and aniseikonia. Vitreomacular traction caused by the excessive adhesion of vitreous fluid to the retina is related to aniseikonia due to the separation and compression of photoreceptor cells. Macular edema and surgical re-attachment for macula-off rhegmatogenous retinal detachment can also cause an increased separation of macular photoreceptor cells resulting in dysmetropsia. Retinoschisis is another eye disease that has been shown to cause aniseikonia.There is evidence that a lesion appearing in the posterior area of the ventral occipitotemporal visual pathway can cause macropsia. This lesion can be due to an ischemic cell death after an acute posterior cerebral infarction.

=== Medications ===
The most prevalent research on prescription drugs with side effects of macropsia deals with zolpidem and citalopram. Zolpidem is a drug prescribed for insomnia, and although it has proven beneficial effects, there have been numerous reported cases of adverse perceptual reactions. One of these cases discusses an anorexic woman's episode of macropsia, which occurred twenty minutes after taking 10 mg zolpidem. The same woman later had two more episodes of zolpidem-induced macropsia, after taking 5 mg and 2.5 mg zolpidem, respective to each episode. The intensity of the macropsia episodes decreased with the decreasing amount of zolpidem administered; it is implied in the article that the level of intensity was based on the patients accounts of her macropsia episodes, and that no external diagnosis was used. Hoyler points out notable similarities among the different reported cases of zolpidem-induced disorganization. The similarities were that all the cases were reported by women, the disorganization and agitation followed the first administration of zolpidem, and once zolpidem was discontinued, there were no lasting residual effects. It is believed that zolpidem-related macropsia is more prevalent in women because plasma zolpidem concentration is 40% higher in women, a concentration that further increases in anorexic women.

Citalopram-induced macropsia is similar to zolpidem-induced macropsia since both types have been observed in relatively few cases, and neither of the drugs' side effects can be supported by experimental evidence. Citalopram is an antidepressant that inhibits serotonin reuptake. The first case of macropsia thought to be induced by citalopram involves a woman who experienced macropsia after her first administration of 10 mg citalopram. Just as with zolpidem, after the immediate discontinuation of citalopram, there were no further episodes of macropsia.

=== Illicit drugs ===
There are suggestions that visual distortions, such as macropsia, can be associated with cocaine use. Episodes of temporary drug-induced macropsia subside as the chemicals leave the body.

=== Migraine ===
Past research has linked macropsia to migraine. One of these studies was conducted on Japanese adolescents who reported visual episodic illusions with macropsia and showed that illusions are three times more likely to occur in association with migraine. The illusions were most prevalent among girls between the ages of 16 and 18. It is unlikely that macropsia in Japanese adolescents could be due to epileptic seizure since only 0.3% of Japanese adolescents have epilepsy. No evidence of drugs was found, which eliminates the possibility of the macropsia in the adolescents being drug-induced. It is also unlikely for macropsia in adolescent children to be associated with a serious disease. It is usually the macropsia or other visual disturbance which precedes the painful migrainous headaches. The episodes of macropsia can occur as part of the aura in a migraine. These episodes are often brief, lasting only a few minutes. Adolescents who are deemed to have multiple distortions per episode, such as slow motion vision and macropsia, are even more likely to be people with migraine. The macropsia episodes associated with migraine are typically equivalent to the duration of the aura, which can range from moments to 15 minutes. Non-migrainous headaches are not known to be associated with episodic illusions. Even in the absence of a migraine, a fever or a hypnogogic state can provoke visual illusions, which one might claim to be macropsia. A person with macropsia may fail to see the connection between the migraine and the macropsia, since the conditions may not elicit symptoms at the same time. The pathophysiology of the condition is not fully understood, but the timing of some episodic occurrences with the headaches suggests that there is a connection between macropsia and the vasoconstrictive phase of a migraine. The differences in visual phenomena, such as macropsia with slow motion versus macropsia without slow motion, may result from different areas of the brain being affected by migraine.

=== Epilepsy ===
Macropsia may present itself as a symptom of both frontal lobe epilepsy and temporal lobe epilepsy, which may actually help in the diagnosis of those diseases. Children who experience nocturnal hallucinations accompanied by macropsia may seek medical care for panic attack disorders and instead are diagnosed with forms of epilepsy. Epilepsy patients may have no memory of the seizure, but can remember the hallucinations and aura which proceed the attack. Electroencephalography, or EEG imaging, can then be utilized while the patient experiences the episode. It may be subsequently concluded that the EEG is congruent with temporal or frontal lobe seizure. Anxiety and headaches accompany the episodes of visual distortion associated with epilepsy. While Valproic acid has been used to treat this type of seizure, anti-seizure medications appropriate for focal-onset seizures, like oxcarbazapine, have also been used successfully in the treatment of epilepsy-related macropsia.

=== Hypoglycaemia ===
Endogenous hypoglycaemia can result in number of visual disturbances and sometimes macropsia. This kind of hypoglycaemia is defined as having an abnormally low blood-sugar level due to anything other than the exogenous administration of insulin. Macropsia has been observed in experimental hypoglycaemia and in patients receiving insulin therapy.

=== Viruses ===
Patients with both Epstein-Barr virus and infectious mononucleosis have cited an increase in the sizes of perceived objects, coinciding with other symptoms of Alice in Wonderland Syndrome. Additionally, it has been observed that Epstein-Barr patients who cite hallucinations display abnormal MRI scans. The MRI may show swelling of the cerebral cortex, transient T2 prolongation, and transient lesions. Unlike in MRI's, no abnormalities have been reported in CT scans. It is thus recommended that an Epstein-Barr patient who cites visual hallucinations have an MRI scan. Macropsia may appear either before the onset, or after the resolution, of all clinical symptoms associated with the illness. The duration of the disturbances have been shown to range between two weeks and seven months. Almost all patients with macropsia due to infectious mononucleosis make full recoveries. Patients with Coxsackievirus B1 have reported numerous symptoms of Alice in Wonderland Syndrome, the most common of which being macropsia and micropsia.

== Pathophysiology ==
Macropsia may be a result of optical magnification differences between the eyes, retinal receptor distribution, or the cortical processing of the sampled image. The current hypothesis for the occurrence of dysmetropsia is due to the stretching or compression of the retina leading to the displacement of receptors. Macropsia arises from a compressed receptor distribution leading to a larger perceived image size and conversely, micropsia results from stretching of the retina leading to a more sparse receptor distribution that gives a smaller perceived image size. In the case of macropsia, the greater density of photoreceptor cells leads to greater stimulation making the object seem larger. In some cases, the effects of macropsia have been shown to be field dependent, in that the degree of visual distortion is related to the visual field angle. Non-uniform stretching or compression of the receptor distribution could explain the field dependency of the macropsia. If the compression forces were closer to the fovea the resulting compression would cause a greater amount of macropsia at lower field angles with little effect at higher field angles where the receptor distribution is not as compressed. Alterations in receptor distribution can be the result of epiretinal membrane, neuroretina detachment and/or re-attachment, or retinoschisis. Macropsia caused by surgical re-attachment of macula-off rhegmatogenous retinal detachment is not symmetrical around the fovea, resulting in differences size changes in the horizontal and vertical meridians. Asymmetry has also been observed with retinoschisis, in which macropsia generally results in the vertical direction while micropsia presents in the horizontal direction.

== Diagnosis ==
Macropsia is generally diagnosed once a patient complains of the characteristic symptoms, such as disproportionally large objects in their visual field. The Amsler Grid test can be used to diagnose macropsia, along with other visual maladies depending on the subjective disturbance reported by the patient after looking at the Amsler Grid. Outward bulging of the lines on an Amsler Grid is consistent with patients experiencing macropsisa. The New Aniseikonia Test (NAT) can quantify the degree of macropsia or micropsia independently in the vertical and horizontal meridians. The test consists of red and green semicircles on a black background with a white round fixation target. The size of the red semicircle is held constant while the green semicircle is varied in size in 1% increments. The patient wears a pair of red/green goggles so that one eye is tested at a time, and the patient attempts to determine when the semicircles are the same size. This is termed the reversal threshold and the size difference between the semicircles is reported as the degree of aniseikonia. A positive value indicates that the object was perceived bigger and thus corresponds to macropsia, and conversely a negative value indicates micropsia. The Aniseikonia Inspector contains an aniseikonia test based on the same principles as the NAT, but the test is run on a computer screen, it is based on a forced choice method, and it can measure the size difference as a function of the size of the objects. The functionality of being able to measure the size difference as function of the size (i.e. field dependent testing) is especially important when the macropsia (or micropsia) has a retinal origin.

== Treatment ==
The most common way to treat forms of aniseikonia, including macropsia, is through the use of auxiliary optics to correct for the magnification properties of the eyes. This method includes changing the shape of spectacle lenses, changing the vertex distances with contact lenses, creating a weak telescope system with contact lenses and spectacles, and changing the power of one of the spectacle lenses. Computer software, such as the Aniseikonia Inspector, has been developed to determine the prescription needed to correct for a certain degree of aniseikonia. The problem with correction through optical means is that the optics do not vary with field angle and thus cannot compensate for non-uniform macropsia. Patients have reported significantly improved visual comfort associated with a correction of 5-10% of the aniseikonia.With regard to drug-induced or virus-induced macropsia, once the underlying problem, either drug abuse or viral infection, is treated, the induced macropsia ceases.

== Research ==
Future research may focus on ways to limit the occurrence of retinally-induced macropsia due to surgery. In terms of treatment, the most effective optical correction is still being researched with respect to visual field angles and direction to a target. The susceptibility of certain age demographics to macropsia is a subject that requires further validation. Overall, there have not been very many reports of macropsia induced by certain drugs, specifically zolpidem and citalopram. Once a larger effort is made to compile such reports, there will inevitably be more research on the subject of macropsia.
