= Metamorphopsia =

Type of vision distortion

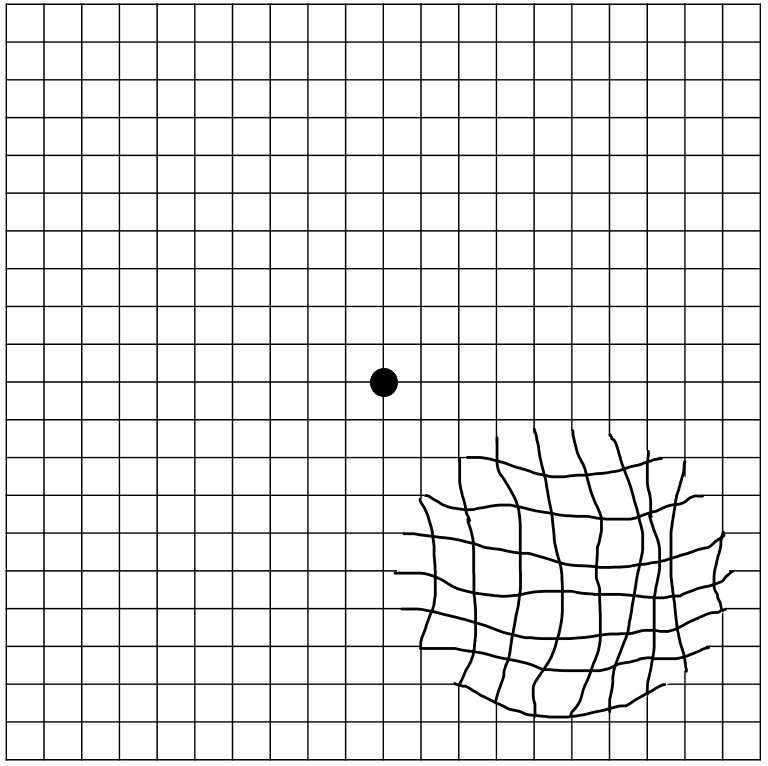
The Amsler grid showing the visual perception of the left eye of a person experiencing metamorphopsia (straight lines appear bent or curved)

Metamorphopsia (from Ancient Greek: μεταμορφοψία, metamorphopsia, 'seeing mutated shapes') is a type of distorted vision in which a grid of straight lines appears wavy or partially blank. In addition, metamorphopsia can result in misperceptions of an object's size, shape, or distance to the viewer. People can first notice they have the condition when looking at mini blinds in their home.

Initially characterized in the 1800s, metamorphopsia was described as one of the primary and most notable indications of myopic and senile maculopathies. Metamorphopsia can present itself as unbalanced vision, resulting from small unintentional movements of the eye as it tries to stabilize the field of vision.

It is mainly associated with macular degeneration, particularly age-related macular degeneration with choroidal neovascularization. Other conditions that can present with complaints of metamorphopsia include: pathological myopia, presumed ocular histoplasmosis syndrome, choroidal rupture and multifocal choroiditis.

== Causes ==
Metamorphopsia can be a symptom of a number of eye disorders involving the retina or macula. Some of these conditions include the following:

- Age-related macular degeneration
- Epiretinal membrane and vitreomacular traction
- Posterior vitreous detachment
- Macular hole

== Pathology ==
The mechanisms that result in the development of metamorphopsia involve structural changes in the retina of the eye (retinal mechanism) as well as processing changes in the cerebral cortex of the brain (cortical mechanism). The retinal mechanism involves the displacement of retinal layers which results in the mislocation of light on the retina. The cortical mechanism, which was discovered after the retinal mechanism, is affected by perceptual filling-in and visual crowding effects. The cortical mechanism was found to work in combination with the retinal mechanism to contribute to metamorphopsia in long-standing maculopathy or after the treatment of macular disorders.

== Diagnosis ==
Tests used for diagnosis of metamorphopsia mostly make use of subjective assessments of how a person views regular patterns. Many of these tests have a poor ability to accurately diagnose or identify a person with the disease (i.e., poor sensitivity). The use of tests such as the preferential hyperacuity perimetry, a psychophysical test that assesses misalignments of visual objects, may permit a more sensitive diagnosis of metamorphopsia.

== Treatment ==
Metamorphopsia is a symptom of several common retinal and macular diseases, therefore treating the underlying disorder can improve symptoms. For people who have conditions such as epiretinal membrane (ERM), macular holes and retinal detachment, decreased metamorphopsia is associated with an increase in visual acuity. Quantitative evaluation of metamorphopsia is an important step in understanding visual functions of individuals with macular disorders and is an essential tool for physicians in evaluating treatment results.

== See also ==
- Dysmorphopsia
- Hallucination
