= Presumed ocular histoplasmosis syndrome =

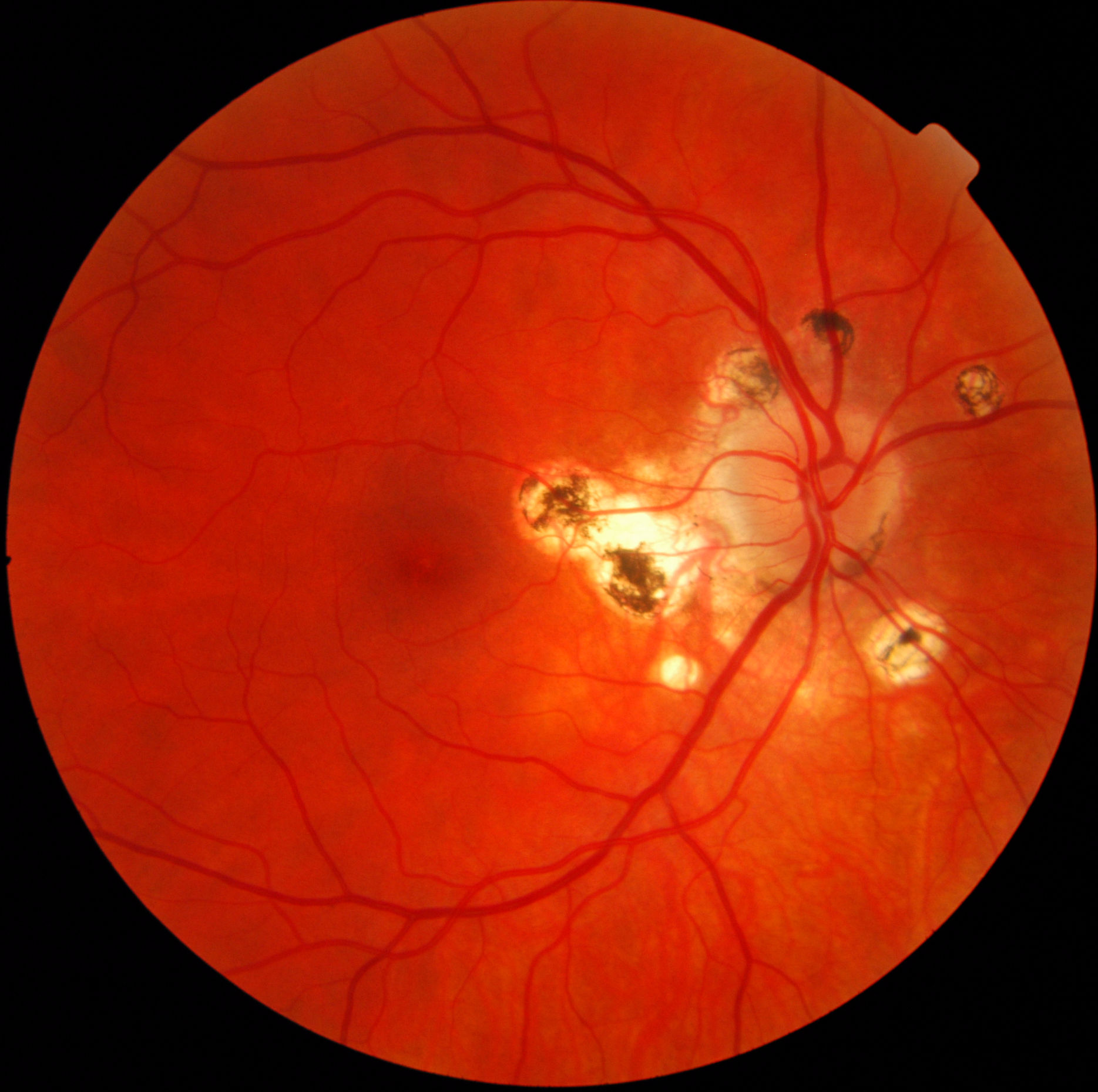
- Retinal photograph of ocular histoplasmosis
- Specialty: Ophthalmology

Presumed ocular histoplasmosis syndrome (POHS) is a syndrome affecting the eye, which is characterized by peripheral atrophic chorioretinal scars, atrophy or scarring adjacent to the optic disc and maculopathy.

The loss of vision in POHS is caused by choroidal neovascularization.

== Presentation ==
The diagnosis of POHS is based on the clinical triad of multiple white, atrophic choroidal scars, peripapillary pigment changes (dark spots around optic disc of the eye), and a maculopathy caused by choroidal neovascularization.

Completely distinct from POHS, acute ocular histoplasmosis may rarely occur in immunodeficiency.

== Causes ==
Despite its name, the "presumed" relationship of POHS to Histoplasma capsulatum is controversial and has been questioned by a number of medical professionals. The fungus has rarely been isolated from cases with POHS, the condition has also been found in locations where histoplasmosis is rare, and there appears to be a relationship with tobacco smoking.

== Diagnosis ==
Fluorescein angiography is usually performed for diagnosis and follow-up of patients with POHS.

== Treatment ==
Treatment requires careful consideration of angiographic findings when a choroidal neovascular membrane is suspected which is a condition that responds to treatment. A vitreo-retinal specialist (an ophthalmologist specialized in treatment of retinal diseases) should be consulted for proper management of the case.

Presumed ocular histoplasmosis syndrome and age-related macular degeneration (AMD) have been successfully treated with laser, anti-vascular endothelial growth factors and photodynamic therapy. Ophthalmologists are using anti-vascular endothelial growth factors to treat AMD and similar conditions since research indicates that vascular endothelial growth factor (VEGF) is one of the causes for the growth of the abnormal vessels that cause these conditions.

== See also ==
- Uveitis
