= Emmert's law =

Emmert's law states that objects that generate retinal images of the same size will look different in physical size (linear size) if they appear to be located at different distances. Specifically, the perceived linear size of an object increases as its perceived distance from the observer increases. This makes intuitive sense: an object of constant size will project progressively smaller retinal images as its distance from the observer increases. Similarly, if the retinal images of two different objects at different distances are the same, the physical size of the object that is farther away must be larger than the one that is closer.

== Creation and purpose ==
Emil Emmert (1844–1911) first described the law in 1881. He noted that an afterimage appeared to increase in size when projected to a greater distance. Some authors thus take Emmert's law to refer strictly to the increase in the apparent size of an after-image when the distance between observer and projection plane is increased, as it did in its original form. Other authors take Emmert's law to apply to any comparative estimation of physical size in which the size of the retinal image, however it may be produced, is equated.

It is unclear whether Emmert intended the increase in distance to refer to an increase in physical distance or an increase in perceived distance, but most authors assume the latter. Under that interpretation, Emmert's law is a special instance of size constancy and of the size–distance invariance hypothesis, which states that the ratio of perceived linear size to perceived distance is a simple function of the visual angle.

The effect of viewing distance on perceived size can be observed by first obtaining an afterimage, which can be achieved by viewing a bright light for a short time, or staring at a figure for a longer time. It appears to grow in size when projected to a further distance. However, the increase in perceived size is much less than would be predicted by geometry, which casts some doubt on the geometrical interpretation given above. Further, the change in perceived size is affected by the illusory distances in the Ames room; this also suggests that, when distance cues are reduced, there is no simple geometrical relationship between perceived afterimage size and actual viewing distance.

== Uses ==
Emmert's law has been used to investigate the moon illusion (the apparent enlargement of the moon or sun near the horizon compared with higher in the sky). A neuroimaging study that examined brain activation when participants viewed afterimages on surfaces placed at different distances found evidence supporting Emmert's Law and thus size constancy played out in primary visual cortex (V1); i.e. the larger the perceived size of the afterimage, the larger the retinotopic activation in V1.

== Limitations ==
Some have criticized the use of Emmert's law as an explanation for phenomena such as the moon illusion, because Emmert's law explains one perception in terms of another, rather than explaining any of the complex internal processes or mechanisms presumably involved in perception. That is, Emmert's law is useful, but it does not explain why you perceive an object as being larger if you perceive it as being farther away.

== See also ==
- Visual perception
- Optical illusion
