= ICHD classification and diagnosis of migraine =

The classification of all headaches, including migraines, is organized by the International Headache Society, and published in the International Classification of Headache Disorders (ICHD). The current version, the ICHD-3 beta, was published in 2013. The first category within the ICHD is Migraine. Migraines are a neurological disorder affecting roughly 14% of the global population.

== Organization of migraine subtypes ==
The ICHD-3 beta classification includes 6 main subtypes of migraine (ICHD-1: 7 main subtypes, ICHD-2: 6 main subtypes), most of which are further subdivided. Overall ICHD-3 beta distinguishes 29 migraine subtypes. The following table outlines the main subtypes and their ICHD-1, -2, -3 beta and ICD-10 codes.

1. Migraine
  1. Migraine without aura
  2. Migraine with aura

ICHD-3	ICHD-2	ICHD-1	ICD-10	ICHD-2, -3 diagnosis
1.1	1.1	1.1	G43.0	Migraine without aura
1.2	1.2	1.2	G43.1	Migraine with aura
1.3	1.5.1	n/a	G43.3	Chronic migraine
1.4	1.5	1.6	G43.3	Complications of migraine
1.5	1.6	1.7	G43.83	Probable migraine
1.6	1.3	1.5	G43.82	Episodic syndromes that may be associated with migraine

== Migraine without aura ==
Diagnostic criteria

1. At least five attacks
2. Each lasting 4–72 hours when untreated
3. With at least two of:
  1. unilateral location
  2. pulsating quality
  3. moderate or severe pain
  4. aggravation by or aversion to routine physical activity
4. With nausea, vomiting or photo- and phonophobia
5. Not attributable to another disorder

— International Headache Society

The ICDH describes migraine without aura as a recurrent headache disorder meeting specific diagnostic criteria. It subdivides this category into three:

1. Pure menstrual migraine without aura
2. Menstrually related migraine without aura
3. Non-menstrual migraine without aura.

In children, the headache more often occurs on both sides, rather than on one side of the head. Menstrual migraines are typically more intense and accompanied by more nausea compared to non-menstrual migraines. While menstrual migraines are also possible in migraine with aura, that is a more rare subtype.

== Migraine with aura ==
Diagnostic criteria

Frequency
At least two attacks
Aura symptoms
One fully reversible aura symptom (e.g., visual disturbances, sensory changes, speech disturbances)
Aura characteristics
most meet at least 3 out of 6: gradual spread, two or more aura symptoms in progression, each aura symptom lasts between 5 and 60 minutes, followed by a headache within 60 minutes, at least one symptom is unilateral or one symptom is positive (e.g. scintellations as a visual disturbance).
Exclusion
Symptoms not attributed to another headache disorder

— International Headache Society

The aura usually precedes the headache phase, but can continue during the headache as well. Most individual experience a visual aura: 90% of people who experience auras have visual disturbances at least sometimes. Pins and needles are the second-most common aura symptom, often affecting one side of the body. Speech disturbances are not always easy to pin down, but can include aphasia (struggling to find words or formulate sentences).

When an individual experiences multiple aura symptoms, they often succeed each other. The first one is often visual, followed by sensory and finally speech. Motor symptoms, when present, can last more than 60 minutes.

=== Migraine with brainstem aura ===
Migraine with brainstem aura (abbreviated MBA; a.k.a. basilar artery migraine, basilar migraine, basilar-type migraine) is a subtype of migraine with aura in which symptoms clearly originate from the brainstem, but no motor weakness. When motor symptoms are present, the subtype is coded as 1.2.3 Hemiplegic migraine. Originally the terms basilar artery migraine or basilar migraine were used but, since involvement of the basilar artery is unlikely, the term migraine with brainstem aura is preferred in ICHD-3 beta. There are typical aura symptoms in addition to the brainstem symptoms during most attacks. Many patients who have attacks with brainstem aura also report other attacks with typical aura and should be coded for both 1.2.1 Migraine with typical aura and 1.2.2 Migraine with brainstem aura. Many of the symptoms like dysarthria, vertigo, tinnitus, hypoacusis, diplopia, ataxia and decreased level of consciousness may occur with anxiety and hyperventilation, and therefore are subject to misinterpretation. Serious episodes of migraine with brainstem aura can lead to stroke, coma, and death. Using triptans and other vasoconstrictors as abortive treatments for migraine with brainstem aura is contraindicated. Abortive treatments for migraine with brainstem aura address vasodilation and restoration of normal blood flow to the vertebrobasilar territory to restore normal brainstem function.

=== Hemiplegic migraine ===
Familial hemiplegic migraine (FHM) is migraine with a possible polygenetic cause—in fact, FHM can only be diagnosed when at least one close relative has it too. The patient experiences typical migraine with aura headache either preceded or accompanied with one-sided, reversible limb weakness and/or sensory difficulties and/or speech difficulties. FHM is associated with ion channel mutations.

When no close family show symptoms, it is known as sporadic hemiplegic migraine.

Effecting a differential diagnosis between basilar migraine and hemiplegic migraine is difficult. Often, the decisive symptom is either motor weakness or unilateral paralysis, which occur in FHM and SHM. Basilar migraine can present tingling and numbness, but true motor weakness and paralysis occur only in hemiplegic migraine.

=== Retinal migraine ===
Retinal migraines are a kind of optical migraine. Those affected will experience a scotoma—a patch of vision loss in one eye surrounded by normal vision—for less than one hour before vision returns to normal. Retinal migraines may be accompanied by a throbbing unilateral headache, nausea, or photophobia.

== Abdominal migraine ==
Abdominal migraine is a recurrent disorder of unknown origin, principally affecting children. Sometimes early on, it can be misdiagnosed in an ER setting as appendicitis. Episodes feature nausea, vomiting, and moderate-to-severe central, abdominal pain. The child is well between episodes. The International Classification of Headache Disorders definition is:

Diagnostic criteria:

A. At least 5 attacks fulfilling criteria B-D.
B. Attacks of abdominal pain lasting 1-72 hours (untreated or unsuccessfully treated)
C. Abdominal pain has all of the following characteristics:

1. midline location, periumbilical or poorly localized
2. dull or "just sore" quality
3. moderate or severe intensity

D. During abdominal pain at least 2 of the following:

1. anorexia
2. nausea
3. vomiting
4. pallor

E. Not attributed to another disorder

— International Classification of Headache Disorders

Most children with abdominal migraines will develop migraine headache in adult life; the two propensities might co-exist during the child's adolescence.

Treating an abdominal migraine can often be difficult; medications used to treat other forms of migraines are usually employed. These include Elavil, Wellbutrin SR, and Topamax.

In some cases, the abdominal migraine is a symptom linked to cyclic vomiting syndrome. There may be a history of migraines in the family of the patient.

== Menstrual migraine ==
Diagnostic criteria for A1.1.1

A. Attacks, in a menstruating woman, fulfilling the criteria for migraine without aura
B. Attacks that occur exclusively from days -2 to +3 of menstruation in at least two out of three menstrual cycles and at no other times of the cycle.

Note: The first day of menstruation is day +1, and the preceding day is day -1; there is no day 0.

— International Headache Society
Diagnostic criteria for A1.1.2

1. Attacks, in a menstruating woman, fulfil criteria for migraine without aura
2. Only occur from days -2 to +3 of menstruation in at least two out of three cycles, and also at other times of the menstrual cycle

NB Day +1 is the 1st. The preceding day is day -1.

— International Headache Society

It is well documented that migraine occurs nearly three times as often in women than in men, and is one of the top five most common disabling conditions in women. In over half these women, their headaches are strictly related to their menstrual cycle.

A clinical epidemiological study suggests that 60% of women with migraine without aura have attacks almost only while menstruating. One in ten had their migraines begin with their first period. Two-thirds do not get migraines while pregnant.

This relationship was noted by the IHS in both versions of the ICHD, and particularly that this disorder fell under migraine without aura. The ICHD-1 referred to this as menstrual migraine, noting that there were no strict guidelines for this diagnosis, but that at least 90% of a woman's attacks should occur within two days of the beginning or end of menstruation. When the ICHD-2 was published, explicit guidelines for a diagnosis of two distinct types of menstruation-related migraine were released, and appear to the right. However, because the nature of the relationship is still unclear, and because the IHS was still uncertain as to whether these were a subset of migraine without aura or a distinct class of migraine, the criteria were delegated to an appendix, while anticipating that they would appear within the main text in the next revision.

The ICHD-2 specifies two different forms of the previously dubbed "menstrual migraine": pure menstrual migraine without aura and menstrually-related migraine without aura. The sole difference between these diagnoses is the occurrence of headache attacks outside of the 5-day period described in the diagnostic criteria. If a woman experiences no attacks outside of this 5-day period, she may be diagnosed with pure menstrual migraine with aura; if she does experience other attacks, however, she may develop menstrually-related migraine without aura. This distinction is made solely for treatment purposes; a woman who only experiences migraines in that 5-day period is likely to benefit more from hormone therapy than a traditional migraine medication such as a triptan.

One defining characteristic of these menstrual migraines is that the woman does not experience an aura. Clinical research has shown migraine with aura to be unrelated to the menstrual cycle, and, in women who have headaches sometimes with aura and sometimes without, the presence or absence of aura does not appear to be related to the menstrual cycle.

As well as being split into two classes, menstrual migraines may have two different pathophysiologies, based on whether or not a woman is taking any oral contraceptives or another form of cyclical hormone replacement therapy. When these medications are being used, the regular hormonal changes that take place and result in ovulation and other events in the menstrual cycle are suppressed, and menstruation is instead the result of withdrawal from abnormal progestogen concentrations.

Menstrual migraines may also be linked to oestrogen withdrawal. Under the category of headache attributed to a substance or its withdrawal, the ICHD specifies the diagnostic criteria for oestrogen-withdrawal headache (8.4.3, G44.83 and Y42.4), and suggests that both that diagnosis and one of the menstrual migraine diagnoses be used in case of migraines related to oestrogen withdrawal occurring mainly at menstruation.

== Acephalgic migraine ==
Acephalgic migraine is a neurological syndrome. It is a variant of migraine in which the patient may experience aura symptoms such as scintillating scotoma, nausea, photophobia, hemiparesis and other migraine symptoms but does not experience headache. Acephalgic migraine is also referred to as amigrainous migraine, ocular migraine, ophthalmic migraine or optical migraine, the last three of which are misnomers.

People with acephalgic migraine are more likely than the general population to develop classical migraine with headache.

The prevention and treatment of acephalgic migraine is broadly the same as for classical migraine. However, because of the absence of "headache", diagnosis of acephalic migraine is apt to be significantly delayed and the risk of misdiagnosis significantly increased.

Visual snow was once grouped with the persistent visual phenomena of migraine, but it is now considered a separate disorder, although the two often occur together.

If symptoms are primarily visual, it may be necessary to consult an optometrist or ophthalmologist to rule out potential eye disease before considering this diagnosis.
