= Migraine aura without headache =

Neurological syndrome involving a migraine without headache

Example of a time-lapse visualization, originally often over 30 minutes.

Migraine aura without headache (also isolated visual migraine, silent migraine and formerly acephalgic migraine) is a relatively uncommon variant of migraine in which individuals experience some migraine symptoms such as aura, nausea, photophobia, and hemiparesis, but do not experience headache. It is generally classified as an event fulfilling the conditions of migraine with aura with no (or minimal) headache. It is sometimes distinguished from visual-only migraine aura without headache, also called ocular migraine.

== Symptoms and misdiagnosis ==
Migraine auras without headaches can occur in individuals of any age. Some individuals, usually males, only experience silent migraines, but frequently patients also experience migraine with headache. Generally, the condition is more than twice as likely to occur in females than males. Pediatric silent migraines are listed along with other childhood periodic syndromes by W.A. Al-Twaijri and M.I. Shevell as "migraine equivalents" (although not listed as such in the International Classification of Headache Disorders), which can be good predictors of the future development of typical migraines. Individuals who experience silent migraines in childhood are highly likely to develop typical migraines as they grow older. Among women, incidents of migraine auras without headache increase during perimenopause.

Scintillating scotoma is the most common symptom which usually happens concurrently with Expanding Fortification Spectra. Also frequently reported is monocular blindness. Acephalgic migraines typically do not persist more than a few hours and may last for as little as 15 seconds. On rare occasions, they may continue for up to two days.

Silent migraines may resemble transient ischemic attacks or, when longer in duration, stroke. The concurrence of other symptoms such as photophobia and nausea can help in determining the proper diagnosis. Occasionally, patients with silent migraine are misdiagnosed as having epilepsy with visual seizures, but the reverse misdiagnosis is more common.

== Treatment ==
The prevention and treatment of migraine auras without headaches is broadly the same as for classical migraine, but the symptoms are usually less severe than those of classic migraine, so treatment is less likely to be required. Some specialists have prescribed the use of antiplatelet treatments such as daily aspirin as a preventive treatment for certain patients with migraine aura without headaches. Other treatments used on a case-by-case basis include magnesium and lamotrigine.

== See also ==
- ICHD classification and diagnosis of migraine
