= Hubert Airy =

English physician (1838–1903)

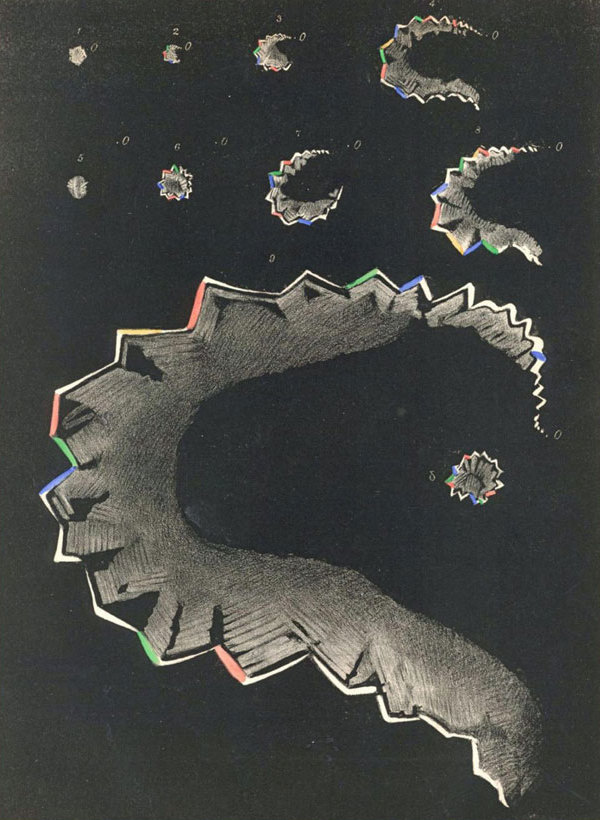
Illustration from 1870, by Hubert Airy, is one of the first pictures of a migraine aura.

Hubert Airy (June 14, 1838 – June 1, 1903) was an English physician who was the pioneer in the study of a migraine. He was the son of Sir George Airy, Astronomer Royal. He has two portraits in the National Portrait Gallery.

Airy was one of the first to describe the common visual aura, which is the second stage in an outbreak of a migraine attack and precede a headache, and also coined the term scintillating scotoma for it.
