= ZD-9379 =

Antagonist of the NMDA receptor at the glycine site

Names
- IUPAC name 7-Chloro-2-(4-methoxy-2-methylphenyl)-3,5-dihydropyridazino[4,5-b]quinoline-1,4,10-trione

Identifiers
CAS Number	170142-20-8
3D model (JSmol)	Interactive image
ChEMBL	ChEMBL4099756
ChemSpider	8018743
PubChem CID	9843028
- InChI: InChI=1S/C19H14ClN3O4/c1-9-7-11(27-2)4-6-14(9)23-19(26)15-16(18(25)22-23)21-13-8-10(20)3-5-12(13)17(15)24/h3-8H,1-2H3,(H,21,24)(H,22,25) Key: PSTDMIAVUUYOOQ-UHFFFAOYSA-N
- SMILES: CC1=C(C=CC(=C1)OC)N2C(=O)C3=C(C(=O)N2)NC4=C(C3=O)C=CC(=C4)Cl

Properties
Chemical formula	C_{19}H_{14}ClN_{3}O_{4}
Molar mass	383.79 g·mol^{−1}
- Except where otherwise noted, data are given for materials in their standard state (at 25 °C [77 °F], 100 kPa). Infobox references

ZD-9379 is an antagonist of the N-methyl-D-aspartate receptor. It possesses neuroprotective properties and could potentially be used for the treatment of certain strokes.

== Mechanism of action ==
ZD-9379 works by antagonizing (blocking) the glycine site on the NMDA receptor, because both glycine (co-agonist) and an agonist at the main site are needed to activate the NMDA receptor, blocking the glycine binding site prevents the receptor from activating.

== Potential use ==
In rats, ZD-9379 has been tested to help spreading depression and brain infarction, results have shown that treatment with ZD-9379 reduced the amount of spreading depressions and the volume of infarcts. Another study was also able to produce similar results.
