= Scintillating scotoma =

Visual aura associated with migraine

- Other names: Visual migraine Teichopsia
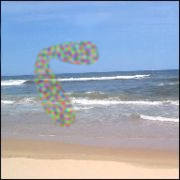
- Example of a scintillating scotoma, as may be caused by cortical spreading depression
- Specialty: Neurology, Neuro-ophthalmology
- Symptoms: Aura in vision, nausea, dizziness, brain fog
- Complications: Migraine onset
- Duration: Less than 60 minutes
- Causes: Cortical spreading depression
- Risk factors: Migraine sufferer
- Differential diagnosis: Persistent aura without infarction, Retinal migraine
- Prevention: Avoiding Migraine triggers
- Prognosis: Self-limiting

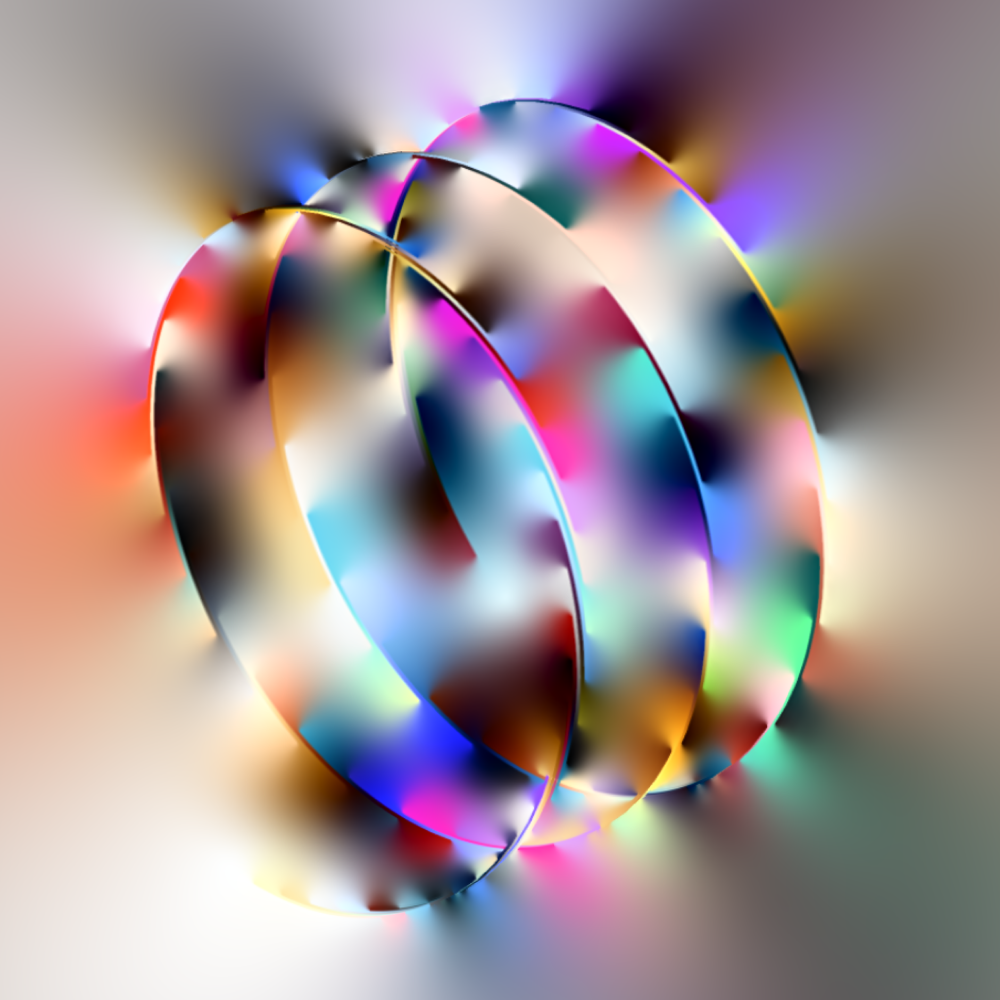
Still image from an artist's exploration that triggered in many viewers the visual experience of a migraine aura or scintillating scotoma.

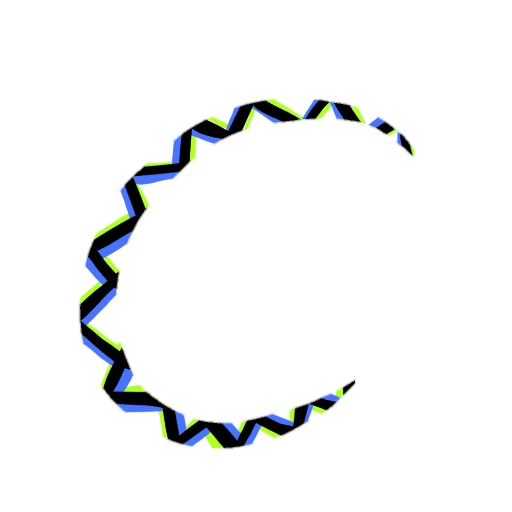
Artist's depiction of a scintillating scotoma, exhibiting a flashing visual pattern similar to dazzle camouflage used during WWI.

Scintillating scotoma is a visual aura that was first described by 19th-century physician Hubert Airy (1838–1903). Originating from the brain, it may precede a migraine headache, but can also occur without headache (also known as visual migraine). It is often confused with retinal migraine, which originates in the eyeball or socket.

== Signs and symptoms ==
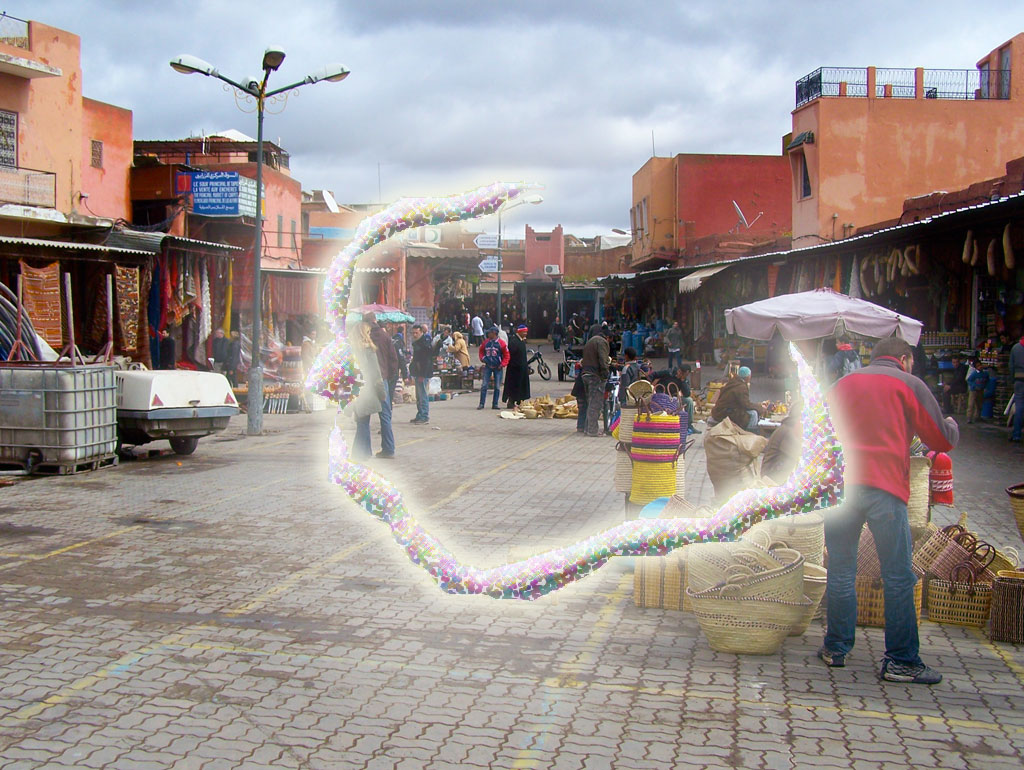
An artist's depiction of a scintillating scotoma with a bilateral arc

Many variations occur, but scintillating scotoma usually begins as a spot of flickering light near or in the center of the visual field, which prevents vision within the scotoma area. It typically affects both eyes, as it is not a problem specific to one eye. The affected area flickers but is not dark. It then gradually expands outward from the initial spot. Vision remains normal beyond the borders of the expanding scotoma(s), with objects melting into the scotoma area background similarly to the physiological blind spot, which means that objects may be seen better by not looking directly at them in the early stages when the spot is in or near the center. The scotoma area may expand to occupy one half of the visual area of one eye, or it may be bilateral. It may occur as an isolated symptom without headache in acephalgic migraine.

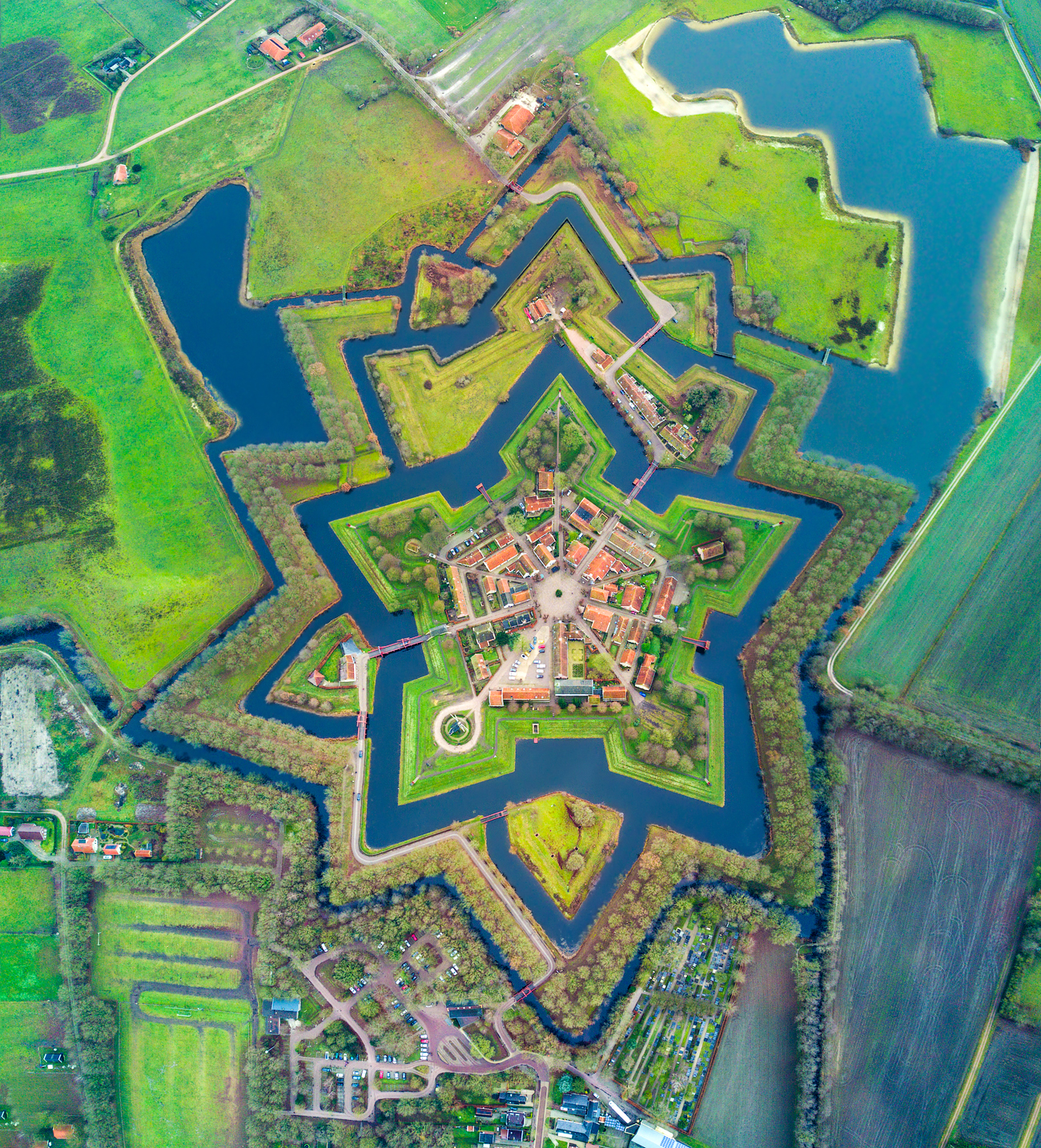
In teichopsia, migraine sufferers may see patterns that look like the shape of the walls of a star fort.

As the scotoma area expands, some people perceive only a bright flickering area that obstructs normal vision, while others describe seeing various patterns. Some describe seeing one or more shimmering arcs of white or colored flashing lights. An arc of light may gradually enlarge, become more obvious, and may take the form of a definite zigzag pattern, sometimes called a fortification spectrum (i.e. teichopsia, from Greek τεῖχος, town wall), because of its resemblance to the fortifications of a castle or fort seen from above. It also can resemble the dazzle camouflage patterns used on ships in World War I. Others describe patterns within the arc as resembling herringbone or Widmanstätten patterns.

The visual anomaly results from abnormal functioning of portions of the occipital cortex at the back of the brain, not in the eyes nor any component thereof, such as the retinas. This is a different disease from retinal migraine, which is monocular (only one eye).

It may be difficult to read and dangerous to drive a vehicle while the scotoma is present. Normal central vision may return several minutes before the scotoma disappears from peripheral vision.

Sufferers can keep a diary of dates on which the episodes occur to show to their physician, plus a small sketch of the anomaly, which may vary between episodes.

Animated depictions

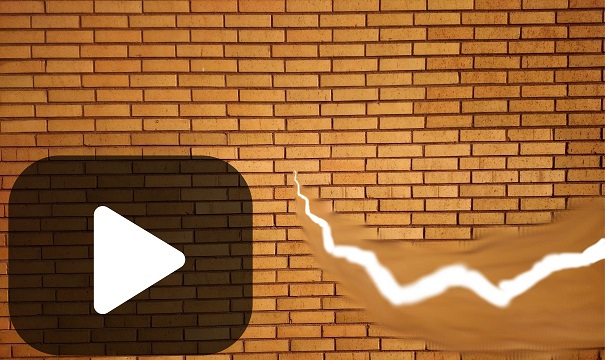
Flickering animation of a scintillating scotoma, where the scintillations were of a zigzag pattern starting in the center of vision, surrounded by a somewhat larger scotoma area with distortion of shapes but otherwise melting into the background similarly to the physiological blind spot

A depiction of a scintillating scotoma that was almost a spiral, with distortion of shapes but otherwise melting into the background similarly to the physiological blind spot. This depiction shows the type of patterning that some have described as similar to Widmanstätten patterns.

A depiction of a scintillating scotoma that was almost spiral-shaped, with distortion of shapes but otherwise melting into the background similarly to the physiological blind spot

== Causes ==
Scintillating scotomas are most commonly caused by cortical spreading depression, a pattern of changes in the behavior of nerves in the brain during a migraine. Migraines, in turn, may be caused by genetic influences and hormones. People with migraines often self-report migraine triggers involving stress or foods, or bright lights. While monosodium glutamate (MSG) is frequently reported as a dietary trigger, other scientific studies do not support this claim.

The Framingham Heart Study, published in 1998, surveyed 5,070 people between ages 30 and 62 and found that scintillating scotomas without other symptoms occurred in 1.23% of the group. The study did not find a link between late-life onset scintillating scotoma and stroke.

== Prognosis ==
Symptoms typically appear gradually over 5 to 20 minutes and generally last less than 60 minutes, leading to the headache in classic migraine with aura, or resolving without consequence in acephalgic migraine. For many sufferers, scintillating scotoma is first experienced as a prodrome to migraine, then without migraine later in life. Typically the scotoma resolves spontaneously within the stated time frame, leaving no subsequent symptoms, though some report fatigue, nausea, and dizziness as sequelae.

== Names and etymology ==
British physician John Fothergill described the condition in the 18th century and called it fortification spectrum. The British physician Hubert Airy coined the term scintillating scotoma for it by 1870; he derived it from the Latin scintilla "spark" and the Ancient Greek skotos "darkness". Other terms for the condition include flittering scotoma, fortification figure, fortification of Vauban, geometrical spectrum, herringbone, Norman arch, teichopsia, and teleopsia.

== See also ==
- Anomalous experiences
- Phosphene – Visual illusion
