= Benign paroxysmal vertigo of childhood =

- Specialty: ENT surgery

Benign paroxysmal vertigo of childhood is a neurological disorder that causes vertigo, a type of dizziness, in children. It is one of the most common causes of vertigo in children and is considered a subtype of migraine. BPVC is characterized by repeated, sudden episodes of vertigo that stop without intervention, typically lasting a few minutes. It is thought to occur due to a decrease in blood flow to the vestibular system, which regulates the body's balance and sense of position in space. These episodes do not require treatment and typically resolve by adolescence.

== Presentation ==
BPVC presents as recurrent episodes of vertigo that occur without warning and cease spontaneously. These episodes typically last a few minutes, but some children experience episodes lasting for hours. Between episodes, children with BPVC are asymptomatic and function normally. Episodes may be triggered by poor sleep or specific foods, although a trigger is not identified in every case. Unlike in benign paroxysmal positional vertigo (BPPV), episodes are not triggered by a change in head position.

These episodes may be associated with:

- Nystagmus - rapid, involuntary movements of the eye
- Ataxia - impaired balance and coordination
- Nausea and/or vomiting
- Pale skin
- Feeling of fearfulness
- Sensitivity to light and/or sound
- Visual aura

Children with BPVC do not lose consciousness during episodes. Headaches are not typical of this condition.

== Pathophysiology ==
Although the specific mechanism is not fully understood, BPVC is thought to occur due to a temporary impairment in blood flow to the inner ear, resulting in reduced oxygen supply to the vestibular system, which normally regulates balance and the body's sense of position.

== Diagnosis ==
BPVC is considered to be a type of migraine.

The diagnosis of BPVC is made clinically. According to the International Classification of Headache Disorders ICHD-3 diagnostic criteria (ICHD-3), patients must have experienced at least five episodes of vertigo that occurred suddenly and resolved spontaneously. The episodes must be associated with nystagmus, ataxia, vomiting, pale skin, or a feeling of fearfulness, and cannot be accompanied by loss of consciousness. Hearing and neurologic function must be normal between episodes.

An electroencephalogram is not needed for diagnosis but may be useful in ruling out other possible causes.

=== Differential diagnosis ===
Although BPVC is one of the most common causes of vertigo in children, there are many other possible causes.

- Vestibular migraine (VM) - Another common cause of vertigo in the pediatric population. Similar to BPVC, VM is a type of migraine and episodic in nature; however, it is characterized by a migrainous headache during episodes of vertigo.
- Benign paroxysmal positional vertigo (BPPV) - This is the most common cause of vertigo in adults, but it is rarer in children. Unlike BPVC, BPPV is provoked by changes in the head position.
- Otitis media and Vestibular neuritis - Unlike BPVC, these conditions are both associated with ear pain or fullness, and the vertigo is not episodic.
- Head trauma
- Brain tumor
- Autonomic dysfunction - This is characterized by light-headedness rather than dizziness.

== Epidemiology ==
BPVC is one of the most common causes of vertigo in children, with an estimated prevalence of 2.6% among the pediatric population. Females are more likely to develop BPVC than males. Episodes typically begin between 3 and 6 years of age and resolve by adolescence.

== Treatment ==
Avoiding any known triggers is crucial in managing BPV. Medical treatment is not usually indicated for BPVC because the episodes are brief and resolve a few years after onset. Children that experience longer episodes may benefit from anti-vertigo medications such as meclizine. There is little data examining the role of preventative medication or other management options such as physical therapy.

== Outcomes ==
BPVC typically resolves on its own prior to adolescence. However, children that have had BPVC are more likely to develop another migraine disorder in adolescence or adulthood.
