= Management of migraine =

Management of neurological disorder

Migraine may be treated either prophylactically (preventive) or abortively (rescue) for acute attacks. Migraine is a complex condition; there are various preventive treatments which disrupt different links in the chain of events that occur during a migraine attack. Rescue treatments also target and disrupt different processes occurring during migraine.

== Preventive treatment ==
Because of the complexity of migraine, no preventive treatment modality is effective for all migraine sufferers. However, there is strong evidence that hormonal changes, stress, quality of sleep, and fasting are causally related to migraine attacks. Lifestyle changes that address such catalyst triggers, such as regular sleep, regular meals, and stress management, may help to prevent migraines. Preventive treatments can be sub-divided into non-drug treatments, and treatment with medication. There are several non drug treatments suggested in the literature including weight control, management of migraine comorbidities, lifestyle modification, behavioural treatment and biofeedback, patient education, using headache diaries, and improving patients' knowledge about the disease. A systematic review conducted by researchers found interventions that could reduce the prevalence and severity of migraines such as cognitive behavioral therapy (CBT), relaxation techniques, and mindfulness-based approaches. Dental appliances such as the Nociceptive Trigeminal Inhibition Tension Suppression System might be used in specific circumstances.

== Rescue (or abortive) treatment ==
Rescue treatment involves acute symptomatic control with medication. Recommendations for rescue therapy of migraine include: (1) migraine-specific agents such as triptans, CGRP antagonists, or ditans for patients with severe headaches or for headaches that respond poorly to analgesics, (2) non-oral (typically nasal or injection) route of administration for patients with vomiting, (3) avoid medication overuse headache by educating patients using prophylactic therapies. Medications are more effective if used earlier in an attack.

The frequent use of medication may result in medication overuse headache (MOH), in which the headaches become more severe and more frequent. This may occur with triptans, ergotamines, and analgesics, especially opioids or narcotic analgesics. Combination of opioids with other analgesics is thought to nearly double the risk of MOH.

Spinal manipulation for treating an ongoing migraine headache is not supported by evidence.

=== Ditans ===
Ditans are a class of abortive medication for the treatment of migraines. Oral lasmiditan (Reyvow) is approved in the US by the FDA for the acute treatment of migraine in adults.

=== Analgesics ===
Recommended initial treatment for those with mild to moderate symptoms are simple analgesics such as non-steroidal anti-inflammatory drugs (NSAIDs) or the combination of acetaminophen (paracetamol), acetylsalicylic acid (aspirin), and caffeine, although caffeine overuse can be a contributor to migraine chronification as well as a migraine trigger for many patients. Aspirin (900 to 1000 mg) can relieve moderate to severe migraine pain, with an effectiveness similar to sumatriptan. Paracetamol, either alone or in combination with metoclopramide (an anti-nausea drug), is an effective treatment with a low risk of adverse effects. In pregnancy, paracetamol and metoclopramide are deemed safe as are NSAIDs until the third trimester. Intravenous metoclopramide is also effective by itself.

Several NSAIDs, including diclofenac and ibuprofen, have evidence to support their use. Ibuprofen provides effective pain relief in about 50%. Diclofenac has been found effective. Ketorolac is available in intravenous and intramuscular formulations. The two main adverse drug reactions (ADRs) associated with NSAIDs relate to gastrointestinal (GI) effects and renal effects of the agents. Naproxen by itself may not be effective as a stand-alone medicine to stop a migraine headache, as it is only weakly better than a placebo medication in clinical trials.

=== Triptans ===
Triptans such as sumatriptan are effective for both pain and nausea in up to 75% of migraineurs. They are the initially recommended treatments for those with moderate to severe pain or those with milder symptoms who do not respond to simple analgesics. The different forms available include oral, injectable, nasal spray, rectal, and oral dissolving tablets. For people with migraine symptoms such as nausea or vomiting, taking the abortive medicine by mouth or through the nose may be difficult. All routes of administration have been shown to be effective at reducing migraine symptoms; however, nasal and injectable subcutaneous administration may result in more side effects. The adverse effects associated with rectal administration have not been well studied. In general, all the triptans appear equally effective, with similar side effects. However, individuals may respond better to specific ones.

Most side effects are mild, including flushing; however, rare cases of myocardial ischemia have occurred. They are thus not recommended for people with cardiovascular disease, who have had a stroke, or have migraines that are accompanied by neurological problems. In addition, triptans should be prescribed with caution for those with risk factors for vascular disease. While historically not recommended in those with basilar migraines, there is no specific evidence of harm from their use in this population to support this caution. Triptans are not addictive, but may cause medication overuse headaches if used more than 10 days per month.

Sumatriptan does not prevent other migraine headaches from starting in the future. For increased effectiveness at stopping migraine symptoms, a combined therapy that includes sumatriptan and naproxen may be suggested.

The combination meloxicam/rizatriptan (Symbravo) was approved for medical use in the United States in January 2025.

=== Ergots ===
Ergotamine and dihydroergotamine are older medications still prescribed for migraines, the latter in nasal spray and injectable forms. They appear equally effective to the triptans, are less expensive, and experience adverse effects that typically are benign. In the most debilitating cases, such as those with status migrainosus, they appear to be the most effective treatment option. The most common adverse effects are nausea, vomiting, abdominal pain, generalized weakness, tiredness, malaise, paresthesia, coldness, muscle pains, diarrhea, and chest tightness. These are less common with DHE than with ergotamine tartrate. Ergots can cause vasospasm, including coronary vasospasm, and are contraindicated in people with coronary artery disease.

=== Phenothiazines ===
Phenothiazines, often used for the treatment of nausea and vomiting, are also effective for treating migraine headaches. Prochlorperazine is typically used due to a more favorable treatment profile.

=== Gepants ===
Gepants may be used for rescue as well as prevention. Some gepants are approved for different purposes in different jurisdictions. Zavegepant was approved for medical use in the United States in March 2023.

=== Antiemetics ===
Metoclopramide is a recommended treatment for those who present to the emergency department.

=== Other medications ===
Intravenous metoclopramide, intravenous prochlorperazine, or intranasal lidocaine are other potential options. Metoclopramide or prochlorperazine are the recommended treatments for those who present to the emergency department. Haloperidol may also be useful in this group. A single dose of intravenous dexamethasone, when added to standard treatment of a migraine attack, is associated with a 26% decrease in headache recurrence in the following 72 hours. Spinal manipulation for treating an ongoing migraine headache is not supported by evidence. It is recommended that opioids and barbiturates not be used due to questionable efficacy, addictive potential, and the risk of rebound headache. There is tentative evidence that propofol may be useful if other measures are not effective.

Magnesium is recognized as an inexpensive, over-the-counter supplement that can be part of a multimodal approach to migraine reduction. Some studies have shown to be effective in both preventing and treating migraine in intravenous form. The intravenous form reduces attacks as measured in approximately 15–45 minutes, 120 minutes, and 24-hour time periods, magnesium taken orally alleviates the frequency and intensity of migraines.

The combination meloxicam/rizatriptan (Symbravo) was approved for medical use in the United States in January 2025.

=== Migraine treatment for children ===
For children, ibuprofen or other NSAIDs help decrease pain. Triptans are effective, though there is a risk of side effects such as nausea, coronary vasoconstriction, dizziness, paresthesia, flushing, tingling, neck pain, and chest tightness, known as "triptan sensations". Additionally, a combination of cognitive behavioral therapy, biofeedback, and relaxation may decrease migraine frequency in children.

=== Other interventions ===
Occipital nerve stimulation may be effective but has the downsides of being cost-expensive and has a significant amount of complications.

There is modest evidence for the effectiveness of non-invasive neuromodulatory devices, behavioral therapies and acupuncture in the treatment of migraine headaches. There is little to no evidence for the effectiveness of physical therapy, chiropractic manipulation and dietary approaches to the treatment of migraine headaches. Behavioral treatment of migraine headaches may be helpful for those who may not be able to take medications (for example pregnant women).

A PCORI systematic review released in September 2024 evaluated the viability of behavioral interventions for migraine prevention and found that all of or some combination of CBT, relaxation training, and education could yield positive outcomes for reducing the frequency of migraines on the scale of migraine days per month. The reduction with these non-pharmaceutical, non-surgical interventions was estimated to be about 1 migraine day/month, which met the minimum clinical significance threshold. The study also discovered that mindfulness-based stress reduction (MBSR) can potentially reduce the level of disability caused by migraines more than by providing education. Furthermore, the study found that cognitive behavioral therapy combined with relaxation training may lead to a higher frequency of migraine attacks compared to propranolol, but it might also result in improved quality of life. Studies have not sufficiently proven notable effects of behavioral interventions being administered through telehealth compared to inactive controls. The review also found limited and inconsistent evidence that behavioral interventions may reduce the use of acute migraine medications.

== See also ==
- List of investigational headache and migraine drugs
