= Prodrome =

Premonitory signs or symptoms of disease

In medicine, a prodrome is an early sign or symptom (or set of signs and symptoms, referred to as prodromal symptoms) that often indicates the onset of a disease before more diagnostically specific signs and symptoms develop. More specifically, it refers to the period between the first recognition of a disease's symptom until it reaches its more severe form. It is derived from the Greek word prodromos, meaning "running before". Prodromes may be non-specific symptoms or, in a few instances, may clearly indicate a particular disease, such as the prodromal migraine aura.

For example, fever, malaise, headache and lack of appetite frequently occur in the prodrome of many infective disorders. A prodrome can be the early precursor to an episode of a chronic neurological disorder such as a migraine headache or an epileptic seizure, where prodrome symptoms may include euphoria or other changes in mood, insomnia, abdominal sensations, disorientation, aphasia, or photosensitivity. Such a prodrome occurs on a scale of days to an hour before the episode, where an aura occurs more immediate to it.

Prodromal labour, mistakenly called "false labour," refers to the early signs before labour starts.

== In mental health ==
The prodrome is a period during which an individual experiences some symptoms and/or a change in functioning, which can signal the impending onset of a mental health disorder. It is otherwise known as the prodromal phase when referring to the subsyndromal stage or the early abnormalities in behavior, mood, and/or cognition before illness onset. Early detection of the prodrome can create an opportunity to administer appropriate early interventions quickly to try to delay or decrease the intensity of subsequent symptoms.

=== Schizophrenia ===
Schizophrenia was the first disorder for which a prodromal stage was described. People who go on to develop schizophrenia commonly experience non-specific negative symptoms such as depression, anxiety, and social isolation. This is often followed by the emergence of attenuated positive symptoms such as problems with communication, perception, and unusual thoughts that do not rise to the level of psychosis. Closer to the onset of psychosis, people often exhibit more serious symptoms like pre-delusional unusual thoughts, pre-hallucinatory perceptual abnormalities or pre-thought disordered speech disturbances. As positive symptoms become more severe, in combination with negative symptoms that may have begun earlier, the individual may meet the diagnostic criteria for schizophrenia. Although a majority of individuals who experience some of the symptoms of schizophrenia will never meet full diagnostic criteria, approximately 20–40% will eventually be diagnosed with schizophrenia. One of the challenges of identifying and treating the prodrome is that it is difficult to predict who, among those with symptoms, are likely to meet full criteria later.

==== Duration ====
The prodromal phase in schizophrenia can last anywhere from several weeks to several years, and comorbid disorders, such as major depressive disorder, are common during this period.

==== Identification/assessments ====
Screening instruments include the Scale of Prodromal Symptoms and the PROD-screen.

Signs and symptoms of the prodrome to schizophrenia can be assessed more fully using structured interviews. For example, the Structured Interview for Prodromal Syndromes, and the Comprehensive Assessment of At Risk Mental States (CAARMS) are both valid and reliable methods for identifying individuals likely experiencing the prodrome to schizophrenia or related psychotic-spectrum disorders.

There are ongoing research efforts to develop tools for early detection of at-risk individuals. This includes development of risk calculators and methods for large-scale population screening.

==== Interventions ====
Describing the schizophrenia prodrome has been useful in promoting early intervention. Although not all people who are experiencing symptoms consistent with the prodrome will develop schizophrenia, randomized controlled trials suggest that intervening with medication and/or psychotherapy can improve outcomes. Interventions with evidence of efficacy include antipsychotic and antidepressant medications, which can delay conversion to psychosis and improve symptoms. Psychotherapy for individuals and families can also improve functioning and symptomatology; specifically cognitive behavioral therapy (CBT) helps improve coping strategies to decrease positive psychosis symptoms. Additionally, omega-3 fish oil supplements may help reduce prodromal symptoms. Current guidelines suggest that individuals who are at "high risk" for developing schizophrenia should be monitored for at least one to two years while receiving psychotherapy and medication, as needed, to treat their symptoms. However, side effects of medication, such as sedation and weight gain, can still occur.

=== Bipolar disorder ===
==== Symptomology ====
There is also growing evidence that there is a prodromal phase before the onset of bipolar disorder. Although a majority of individuals with bipolar disorder report experiencing some symptoms preceding the full onset of their illness, the prodrome has not yet been described systematically. Descriptive reports of bipolar prodrome symptoms vary and often focus on nonspecific symptoms of psychopathology, making identification of the prodromal phase difficult. The most commonly observed symptoms are too much energy, elated or depressed mood, and alterations in sleep patterns. There are no prospective studies of the prodrome to bipolar disorder, but in the Longitudinal Assessment of Manic Symptoms (LAMS) study, which followed youth with elevated symptoms of mania for ten years, approximately 23% of the sample met the bipolar criteria at the baseline and 13% of which did not meet the criteria at baseline eventually were diagnosed with bipolar disorder.

==== Duration ====
The reported duration of the prodrome to bipolar disorder varies widely (mean = 27.1 ± 23 months); for most people, evidence suggests that the prodromal phase is likely to be long enough to allow for intervention.

==== Identification/assessments ====
Symptoms consistent with the prodrome to bipolar disorder can be identified through semi-structured interviews such as The Bipolar Prodrome Symptom Interview and Scale-Prospective (BPSS-P), and the Semi-structured Interview for Mood Swings and symptom checklists like the Young Mania Rating Scale (YMRS) and the Hamilton Depression Scale (HAM-D).

==== Interventions ====
Early intervention is associated with better outcomes for people with prodromal symptoms of bipolar disorder. Interventions with some evidence of efficacy include medication (e.g. mood stabilizers, atypical antipsychotics) and psychotherapy. Specifically, family-focused therapy improves emotion regulation and enhances functioning in both adults and adolescents. Interpersonal and Social Rhythm Therapy (IPSRT) may be beneficial for youth at risk of developing the disease by helping to stabilize their sleep and circadian patterns.

Psychoeducational Psychotherapy (PEP) may be protective in individuals at risk of developing bipolar disorder and are associated with a four-fold reduction in risk for conversion to bipolar disorder. This research needs to be explored further, however, it is currently thought to produce improvements in decreased stress due to social support and improved functioning through the skills developed in PEP. PEP can prove especially beneficial for individuals presenting transitional mania symptoms as it can assist caregivers in recognizing prodromal mania symptoms and knowing the next steps towards early intervention. The key goals of this type of therapy are to provide education about mood disorders and treatments, social support, and to build skills in symptom management, emotion regulation, and problem-solving and communication. This research is in its infancy, further investigations will be necessary to determine which methods lead to the best outcomes and for whom.

== In neurological conditions ==
=== Neurodegenerative diseases ===
Several neurodegenerative diseases have a prodromal phase. Early impairments in behavior, personality and language may be detected in Alzheimer's disease. In dementia with Lewy bodies, there is an identifiable set of early signs and symptoms that can appear 15 years or more before dementia develops. The earliest symptoms are constipation and dizziness from autonomic dysfunction, hyposmia (reduced ability to smell), visual hallucinations, and rapid eye movement sleep behavior disorder (RBD). RBD may appear years or decades before other symptoms. In Parkinson's disease the loss of sense of smell may aid in earlier diagnosis. Multiple sclerosis may have a prodromal phase.

=== Migraine ===
The prodromal phase of migraine is not always present, and varies from individual to individual, but can include ocular disturbances such as shimmering lights with reduced vision, altered mood, irritability, depression or euphoria, fatigue, yawning, excessive sleepiness, craving for certain food (e.g. chocolate), stiff muscles (especially in the neck), hot ears, constipation or diarrhea, increased urination, and other visceral symptoms.

== See also ==
- Apophenia
- Postdrome
