= Retinal migraine =

Medical condition of the eye

- Other names: Ophthalmic migraine, ocular migraine
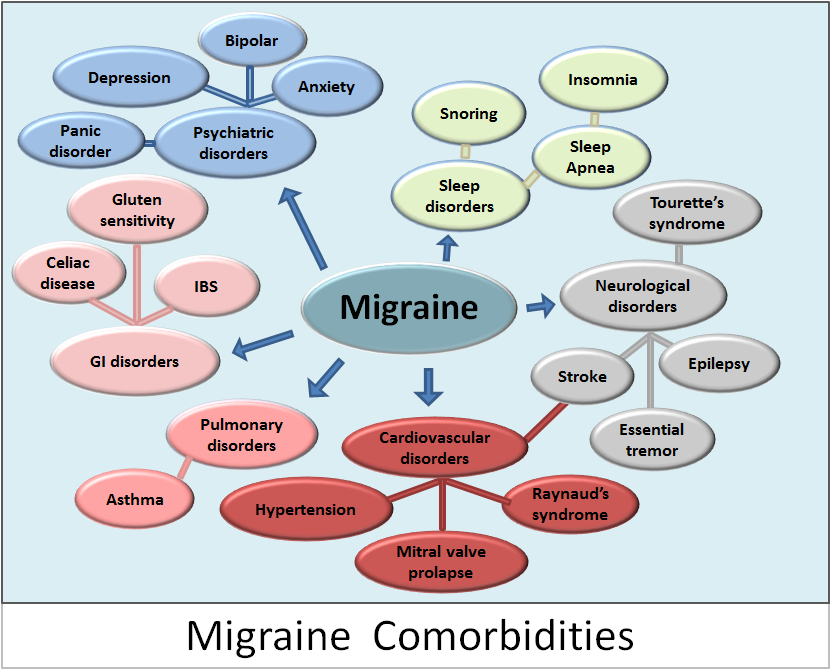
- Connections with migraine
- Specialty: Neurology
- Causes: Stress, smoking, high blood pressure, oral contraceptive pill, exercise, bending over, high altitude, dehydration, low blood sugar, excessive heat
- Frequency: Varies from person to person

Retinal migraine is a retinal disease often accompanied by a migraine headache and typically affects only one eye. It is caused by ischaemia or vascular spasm in or behind the affected eye.

The terms retinal migraine and ocular migraine are often confused with visual migraine, which is a far-more-common symptom of vision loss, resulting from the aura phase of migraine with aura. The aura phase of migraine can occur with or without a headache. Ocular or retinal migraines happen in the eye, so only affect the vision in that eye, while visual migraines occur in the brain, so affect the vision in both eyes together. Visual migraines result from cortical spreading depression and are also commonly termed scintillating scotoma.

== Signs and symptoms ==
Retinal migraine is associated with transient monocular visual loss (scotoma) in one eye lasting less than one hour. During some episodes, the visual loss may occur with no headache and at other times throbbing headache on the same side of the head as the visual loss may occur, accompanied by severe light sensitivity or nausea. Visual loss tends to affect the entire monocular visual field of one eye, not both eyes. After each episode, normal vision returns.

It may be difficult to read and dangerous to drive a vehicle while retinal migraine symptoms are present.

Retinal migraine is a different disease than scintillating scotoma, which is a visual anomaly caused by spreading depression in the occipital cortex at the back of the brain, not in the eyes nor any component thereof. Unlike in retinal migraine, a scintillating scotoma involves repeated bouts of temporary diminished vision or blindness and affects vision from both eyes, upon which patients may see flashes of light, zigzagging patterns, blind spots, or shimmering spots or stars.

== Causes ==
Retinal migraine is caused by the blood vessels (that leads to the eye) suddenly narrowing (constricting), reducing blood flow to the eye, which causes aura in vision.

It may be triggered by:

- Stress
- Smoking
- High blood pressure
- Oral contraceptive pill
- Exercise
- Hay fever
- Bending over
- High altitude
- Dehydration
- Low blood sugar
- Excessive heat

Afterwards, the blood vessels relax, blood flow resumes and sight returns. Usually there are no abnormalities within the eye and permanent damage to the eye is rare.

Retinal migraine tends to be more common in:

- Women
- People aged under 40
- People with a personal or family history of migraines or other headaches
- People with an underlying disease (lupus, hardening of the arteries, sickle cell disease, epilepsy, antiphospholipid syndrome, and giant cell arteritis)

== Diagnosis ==
The medical exam should rule out any underlying causes, such as blood clot, stroke, pituitary tumor, or detached retina. A normal retina exam is consistent with retinal migraine.

== Treatment ==
Treatment depends on identifying behavior that triggers migraine such as stress, sleep deprivation, skipped meals, food sensitivities, or specific activities. Medications used to treat retinal migraines include aspirin and other NSAIDs, and medications that reduce blood pressure.

== Prognosis ==
In general, the prognosis for retinal migraine is similar to that of migraine headache with typical aura. As the true incidence of retinal migraine is unknown, it is uncertain whether there is a higher incidence of permanent neuro retinal injury. The visual field data suggests that there is a higher incidence of end arteriolar distribution infraction and a higher incidence of permanent visual field defects in retinal migraine than in clinically manifest cerebral infarctions in migraine with aura. A 2005 study suggests that more than half of reported recurrent cases of retinal migraine subsequently experienced permanent visual loss in that eye from infarcts, but later studies suggest such loss is a relatively rare side effect.

== See also ==
- Amaurosis fugax
- Entoptic phenomenon
