= Postdrome =

A postdrome is a symptom or set of symptoms that occurs after a particular condition has passed. A common usage of the term is in relation to the effects experienced following the end of a migraine attack.

Reye syndrome can be a postdrome for children after having a viral infection.

== See also ==
- Prodrome
