= Scotoma =

Altered region in an otherwise normal field of vision

- Other names: Scotomas, scotomata
- Animation of a scintillating scotoma that is almost spiral-shaped, with distortion of shapes but otherwise melting into the background similarly to the physiological blind spot, as may be caused by cortical spreading depression
- Specialty: Ophthalmology

A scotoma is an area of partial alteration in the field of vision consisting of a partially diminished or entirely degenerated visual acuity that is surrounded by a field of normal – or relatively well-preserved – vision.

Every normal mammalian eye has a scotoma in its field of vision, usually termed its blind spot. This is a location with no photoreceptor cells, where the retinal ganglion cell axons that compose the optic nerve exit the retina. This location is called the optic disc. There is no direct conscious awareness of visual scotomas. They are simply regions of reduced information within the visual field. Rather than recognizing an incomplete image, patients with scotomas report that things "disappear" on them.

The presence of the blind spot scotoma can be demonstrated subjectively by covering one eye, carefully holding fixation with the open eye, and placing an object (such as one's thumb) in the lateral and horizontal visual field, about 15 degrees from fixation. The size of the monocular scotoma is 5×7 degrees of visual angle.

A scotoma can be a symptom of damage to any part of the visual system, such as retinal damage from exposure to high-powered lasers, macular degeneration, and brain damage.

The term scotoma is also used metaphorically in several fields. The common theme of all the figurative senses is of a gap not in visual function but in the mind's perception, cognition, or world view. The term is from Greek σκότος (skótos) 'darkness'.

== Signs and symptoms ==
Symptom-producing, or pathological, scotomata may be due to a wide range of disease processes, affecting any part of the visual system, including the retina (in particular its most sensitive portion, the macula), the optic nerve and even the visual cortex. A pathological scotoma may involve any part of the visual field and may be of any shape or size. A scotoma may include and enlarge the normal blind spot. Even a small scotoma that happens to affect central or macular vision will produce a severe visual disability, whereas a large scotoma in the more peripheral part of a visual field may go unnoticed by the bearer because of the normal reduced optical resolution in the peripheral visual field.

== Causes ==
Common causes of scotomas include demyelinating disease such as multiple sclerosis (retrobulbar neuritis), damage to nerve fiber layer in the retina (seen as cotton wool spots) due to hypertension, toxic substances such as methyl alcohol, ethambutol and quinine, nutritional deficiencies, vascular blockages either in the retina or in the optic nerve, stroke or other brain injury, and macular degeneration, often associated with aging. Scotomata can also occur in decompression sickness, where gas bubble formation and associated vascular or neurological effects may produce transient or persistent visual field defects. Scintillating scotoma is a common visual aura in migraine. Less common, but important because they are sometimes reversible or curable by surgery, are scotomata due to tumors such as those arising from the pituitary gland, which may compress the optic nerve or interfere with its blood supply.

Rarely, scotomata are bilateral. One important variety of bilateral scotoma may occur when a pituitary tumour begins to compress the optic chiasm (as distinct from a single optic nerve) and produces a bitemporal paracentral scotoma, and later, when the tumor enlarges, the scotomata extend out to the periphery to cause the characteristic bitemporal hemianopsia. This type of visual-field defect tends to be obvious to the person experiencing it but often evades early objective diagnosis, as it is more difficult to detect by cursory clinical examination than the classical or textbook bitemporal peripheral hemianopia and may even elude sophisticated electronic modes of visual-field assessment.

In a pregnant woman, scotomata can present as a symptom of severe pre-eclampsia, a form of pregnancy-induced hypertension. Similarly, scotomata may develop as a result of the increased intracranial pressure that occurs in malignant hypertension.

Aminoglycoside antibiotics, particularly streptomycin, may also cause a scotoma.

== Terminology ==
Beyond its literal sense concerning the visual system, the term scotoma is also used metaphorically in several fields, including neurology, neuropsychology, psychology, philosophy, and politics. The common theme of all the figurative senses is of a gap not in visual function but in the mind's perception, cognition, or world view. Their concrete connection to the literal sense, however, is by the connection between the nervous system and the mind, via the chain of links from sensory input, to nerve conduction, to the brain, to perception (the processing and interpreting of that input) via the brain-mind correlation, to psychological function. Thus there is not only (or not necessarily) a visual inability to see an aspect of reality but also (or instead) a mental inability to conceive even the possibility of seeing that aspect, due to a cognitive schema that lacks any provision for it.

At the most concrete level, there is neuropsychological scotoma. One example is the hemispatial neglect that is sometimes experienced by people who have had strokes. Another type is the phenomenon of reverse or negative phantom limb, in which nerve injuries to the limbs, such as trauma in which a limb's nerves are severed but the limb is spared from amputation, can affect the mind's body schema in such a way that an existing limb seems to its owner like it should not exist, and its presence thus seems uncanny. Neurologist Oliver Sacks, who experienced a reverse phantom leg that later resolved, considered it a form of spatial neglect in the body schema analogous to hemispatial neglect in that the mind could not conceive of the leg as self because it could not conceive that there was any space for the leg to exist in. Sacks and others agreed that the leg thus seemed like someone else's leg, including sometimes a cadaverous one, which was part of the reason for the dysphoria but not the sole explanation. Even for people who intellectually understood that the leg or hand was supposed to be theirs simply could not believe it emotionally and could not completely reconcile reality with schema, prompting great unease. Given how hard this is to comprehend for a person who has not experienced it, people recently experiencing it for the first time consider it both uncanny and ineffable (as Sacks self-reported and found in others). Sacks also explored the regular type of phantom limb (a positive phantom), which does not produce a neuropsychological scotoma but shares with reverse phantoms the trait that the body schema resists revision despite a person's perfect intellectual awareness and acceptance of the current physical reality (that is, that the amputated limb is gone or that the spared limb is still present). This suggests that aspects of schema in the mind (body schema, world schema) have neurologic bases that cannot be revised by mere intellectual understanding—at least not quickly. Sacks does explore the topic of how people adapt to phantoms over the years and how positive phantom limbs often gradually foreshorten and sometimes disappear; but some remain for the rest of life.

At a higher level of abstraction are what have been called psychological scotomas, in which a person's self-perception of his or her own personality is judged by others to have a gap in perceptive ability. Thus, in psychology, scotoma can refer to a person's inability to perceive personality traits in themselves that are obvious to others. And at the highest abstraction level are what have been called intellectual scotomas, in which a person cannot perceive distortions in their world view that are obvious to others. Thus, in philosophy or politics, a person's thoughts or beliefs might be shaped by an inability to appreciate aspects of social interaction or institutional structure.

== See also ==
- Floater
- Scotomization

=== Detection ===
- Amsler grid
- Horizontal eccentricity
- Visual field test

=== Types ===
- Binasal hemianopsia
- Bitemporal hemianopsia
- Cortical spreading depression
- Scintillating scotoma
