= Abdominal aura =

Medical symptom

- Specialty: Neurology, Epileptology
- Symptoms: Abdominal pain, nausea, vomiting
- Causes: Epileptic seizures, migraine
- Differential diagnosis: Irritable bowel syndrome (IBS), infectious gastroenteritis, anxiety
- Treatment: Anticonvulsants

Abdominal aura (from Latin abdomen, "belly", and aura, "wind, odor, or gleam of light"), also known as visceral aura and epigastric aura, is a type of somatosensory aura that typically manifests as abdominal discomfort in the form of nausea, malaise, hunger, or pain. Abdominal aura is typically associated with epilepsy, especially temporal lobe epilepsy, and it can also be used in the context of migraine. The term is used to distinguish it from other types of somatosensory aura, notably visual disturbances and paraesthesia. The abdominal aura can be classified as a somatic hallucination. Pathophysiologically, the abdominal aura is associated with aberrant neuronal discharges in sensory cortical areas representing the abdominal viscera.

== Presentation ==
A variety of sensations and associated symptoms can be attributed to abdominal aura:

- abdominal discomfort, including a feeling of bloating or rumbling
- abdominal pain, which is often midline and cramping
- a 'rising' sensation in the abdomen
- nausea
- vomiting
- flatulence
- hunger
- malaise
- lethargy
- vegetative symptoms such as blushing and sweating

The symptoms of abdominal aura generally coincide with or precede the associated migraine or seizure, and depending on the etiology, they may last seconds to hours.

== Epilepsy ==
In epilepsy, aura refers to a type of focal seizure, in which seizure activity is limited to a portion of the brain and the person remains conscious and may experience a wide variety of sensory effects. This type of focal seizure can often, but does not always, precede or evolve into another type of seizure.

Abdominal aura is a common type of epileptic aura, and it is very common in temporal lobe epilepsy compared to extratemporal focal epilepsies. In one study, more than half of patients with temporal lobe epilepsy experienced abdominal aura, and most of those cases of abdominal aura evolved into a generalized motor seizure.

In addition to the abdominal pain and nausea/vomiting, other symptoms of seizures can sometimes be seen in abdominal epilepsy and may be helpful in diagnosis, including a duration of seconds to minutes, confusion or unresponsiveness during episodes, lethargy or sleep after episodes, and progression from abdominal aura into another type of seizure.

If the abdominal aura does not precede or evolve into another type of seizure, it can be very difficult to diagnose. The most conclusive way to diagnose abdominal epilepsy is by correlating the abdominal symptoms with epileptic activity on an electroencephalogram (EEG).

The presence of episodic abdominal complains in a person with known epilepsy does not necessarily indicate that they are having epileptic abdominal aura, as abdominal discomfort and nausea are very common symptoms in people with and without epilepsy.

Treatment of abdominal epilepsy generally consists of anticonvulsants to prevent the seizures.

== Migraine ==
Migraine aura typically precedes the onset of headache, evolves slowly, and most commonly consists of visual, sensory, and/or speech and language changes. Migraine aura can also occur in isolation without the headache. Nausea, vomiting, and abdominal discomfort are common symptoms of migraine, and while they are not classically considered aura symptoms for the purposes of diagnosing migraine with aura, the abdominal symptoms may still precede and predict the onset of migraine headache.

=== Related disorders ===
Abdominal aura is also seen in some disorders that are closely related to migraine, including cyclical vomiting syndrome and abdominal migraine.

Cyclical vomiting syndrome is a condition associated with recurrent episodic attacks of vomiting with periods of normalcy in between. It most commonly presents in childhood, and its symptoms overlap strongly with the gastrointestinal symptoms of migraine. While poorly understood, it is also believed to be related to migraine in its etiology. There are mitochondrial DNA changes that are common among patients with cyclical vomiting syndrome and patients with migraine, and a family history of migraine is common among people who are diagnosed with cyclical vomiting syndrome.

Abdominal migraine is an episodic disorder associated with recurring episodes of severe abdominal pain in the absence of headache. In addition to abdominal pain, symptoms often include anorexia, nausea, vomiting, and pallor. Episodes typically last 2-72 hours, and patients are completely symptom-free in between episodes. It most commonly presents during childhood, and most children who experience abdominal migraine will go on to develop migraine headaches later in life.

== See also ==
- Aura
- Focal seizure
- Abdominal pain
