= Osmophobia =

Fear of or hypersensitivity to odors

- Specialty: Psychology

Osmophobia or olfactophobia refers to a fear, aversion, or psychological hypersensitivity to odors. Osmophobia seems to be a consistent part of the patient’s migraine history, but additional criteria are needed to differentiate it from episodic tension-type headache (ETTH). The phobia generally occurs in chronic migraine sufferers who may have odor triggered migraines.

Such migraines are most frequently triggered by foul odors, but the hypersensitivity may extend to all odors. One study found as many as 25% of migraine sufferers had some degree of osmophobia. The condition may also be present in individuals in substance withdrawal, specifically opioid withdrawal syndrome, where it is usually associated with nausea and/or vomiting.

The term osmophobia comes from the Greek ὀσμή (osmḗ), meaning "smell, odour", and φόβος (phóbos), meaning "fear". Olfactophobia comes from the Latin olfacto, meaning "to smell at".

== See also ==
- List of phobias
- Olfactory reference syndrome
