= Migraine trigger =

Factors affecting the medical condition migraine

A migraine trigger reduces the threshold for a migraine attack in someone who is predisposed to migraine. Genetic, environmental, and neurological factors affect nerve cells and chemical signals in the brain. Once stimuli exceed an individual's sensitivity threshold, neurological changes can increase activity in pain pathways, heighten blood flow and alter pain signals. In a person who experiences migraines, the brain may respond to stimuli at a lower threshold, respond more strongly to stimuli, or be less able to adjust in ways that reduce discomfort and avoid over-stimulation.

Migraine attacks involve multiple phases: prodrome, aura, headache, and postdrome. The prodrome phase begins 48 hours or more before the headache phase. In about 30% of cases, an aura phase with sensory disturbances occurs just before the headache phase. The 48 hours after the headache pain ceases is the postdrome.

Each trigger increases the risk that a migraine starts

It can be difficult to identify the beginning of a migraine attack and to determine if something is truly a cause rather than a symptom of already-occurring changes in the brain. Internal migraine triggers such as hormones, stress, disturbed sleep, and fasting affect the body's ability to maintain a stable state. External migraine triggers such as temperature, noises, and odors can change how the body reacts to sensory information. There is strong evidence that hormonal changes, stress, quality of sleep, and fasting are causally related to migraine attacks. These "catalyst triggers" may increase activity in the hypothalamus or trigeminal system of the brain until it exceeds the migraine threshold. Some sensory sensitivities, food cravings, and mood changes may be early symptoms of the prodromal phase of migraine, rather than causes of migraine.

The most frequently reported migraine trigger for women is hormonal variation. From puberty onwards, women experience migraine, particularly migraine without aura, more frequently and with greater severity than men. Migraine without aura is strongly related to fluctuations in estrogen both monthly and across a woman's lifespan. The next most reported trigger is stress in both women and men. Disrupted sleep, fasting, missing meals, dehydration, and sensory overstimulation are also commonly reported triggers.

Keeping the body's internal environment stable appears to protect the brain's migraine sensitivity threshold, while disruption and stress may lower the sensitivity threshold. Lifestyle changes that support stability, such as regular sleep, regular meals, and stress management, can help to prevent migraines. Pollutants interfere with sleep and increase migraine activity, so improving air quality can be helpful. Whether a possible trigger is an actual cause or an early symptom, managing exposure to stimuli such as smells, lights, sound or touch may reduce discomfort.

== Mechanisms and timeline ==
Migraine attacks involve multiple phases with different neurological and physical mechanisms and symptoms. Categories of possible migraine triggers include emotions, nutrition, sleep, hormones, weather, environmental factors (noise, smells, lights), and strenuous movement. Relationships between mechanisms and symptoms are complex and may be bidirectional. For example, people with migraine are more likely to become anxious and depressed, but people with anxiety and depression also have a higher risk of becoming affected by migraine.

The initial prodromal or premonitory phase of a migraine attack can start 48 hours or more before the main headache phase. Studies of the brain's structure and function indicate that brain activity in the hypothalamus, thalamus, and cortical regions changes during this time, well before the pain phase of migraine begins.

This can cause prodromal symptoms (PSs) such as fatigue, yawning, difficulty concentrating, mood changes, dizziness, neck pain, light sensitivity, food cravings, and nausea. People experiencing these early warning symptoms can sometimes correctly predict an oncoming headache. Such symptoms may persist into the pain phase and postdrome. Some studies suggest that PSs may be linked to activity in particular neuroanatomical pathways and brain regions. Yawning, food cravings, homeostatic regulation, and sleep disturbance may be linked to activity in the hypothalamus. Other PSs, such as neck pain and nausea, may be related to activity in the brainstem.

An aura phase involving visual or other sensory disturbances can last for 5–60 minutes, generally just prior to the onset of headache pain. Aura occurs in approximately 30% of cases. Women are more likely than men to experience migraine without aura. Women who experience migraine without aura differ from women who experience migraine with aura in onset, symptoms, and recommended treatments. Migraine aura may result from a slow self-propagating spreading wave of hyper-excitation of brain cells (cortical spreading depolarization) that is followed by a lengthy recovery period with reduced blood-flow and lowered neural activity.

The pain phase of a migraine attack can involve increased activity in the pain pathway of the brain, with heightened blood flow and transmission of pain signals. The extent to which a possible trigger is causally linked to the onset of headache is uncertain in most cases. However, there is strong evidence to show that hormonal changes, stress, quality of sleep, and fasting can be causally related to migraine. These "catalyst triggers" may act by increasing activity in the hypothalamus or trigeminal system of the brain until it exceeds the brain's migraine threshold.

The migraine postdrome, or "migraine hangover", includes the 48 hours after the pain ceases. Symptoms during this period can include tiredness, difficulty concentrating, mood changes, thirst, dizziness and euphoria.

== Hormonal changes ==
Hormonal variation is the most frequently reported migraine trigger for women. From puberty onwards, women experience migraine attacks more frequently and with greater severity than men. A population-based study in Denmark suggests the sex difference in attack frequency is largely due to higher rates of migraine without aura (11% in females and 3.59% in males). In comparison, sex differences were not significant in migraine with aura (1.72% in females and 1.58% in males).

This divergence in patterns of migraine attacks in men and women is a result of changes in sex hormones. The incidence of attacks of migraine without aura is strongly related to hormonal fluctuations in estrogen, which varies monthly and across a woman's lifespan. Migraine episodes are more likely to occur immediately before and during menstruation, possibly due to the drop in estrogen levels before the menstrual period.

The occurrence of migraine without aura displays an age-related pattern. First onset of migraine is often reported around the first menstrual cycle, and the likelihood of occurrence increases from early adulthood throughout the childbearing years. Incidence and severity of migraine without aura peaks between ages 35 and 50. Attacks may worsen during perimenopause due to irregular periods and fluctuating estrogen levels. In some cases, the first onset of migraine may occur during perimenopause. Following menopause, estrogen levels tend to stabilize at a lower rate, and migraine frequency and severity are likely to decrease.

Migraine episodes tend to diminish during the 2nd and 3rd trimesters of pregnancy, when elevated estrogen levels are stable. They are likely to return following the abrupt drop in estrogen levels after childbirth.

Relationships between oral contraceptive use and migraine are less clear, and may differ depending on migraine type, age, and characteristics of the menstrual cycle. In some cases, use of combined hormonal contraception or hormone replacement therapy can help to stabilize estrogen levels and prevent migraines. However, suddenly stopping hormonal contraceptives may be associated with increased attacks. Transgender women receiving hormone therapy may experience an increased incidence of migraine. and care should be taken to maintain steady levels of estrogen and monitor carefully for increased risk of ischemic stroke in cases of migraine with aura.

Women who experience migraine with aura differ from women who experience migraine without aura in onset, symptoms, and recommended treatments. Women who perceive aura are more likely to have experienced the first onset of migraine before menarche (the first occurrence of a menstrual cycle). For women who experience migraine with aura, migraines are less likely to improve during pregnancy, and use of oral contraceptives may worsen attacks or increase other health risks. Migraine with aura is associated with higher risks for ischemic stroke and heart disease.

Underlying mechanisms are complex and inter-related. Estrogens affect multiple neurotransmitter systems involved in migraine development and pain perception. They activate several types of estrogen receptors in the central nervous system (CNS), influencing neurotransmission and cell function, and setting off intracellular signaling cascades that can modify those neurotransmitter systems. Estrogens can enhance activity in the serotonergic system, helping to protect against migraine attacks. However, estrogens can also reduce activation of the opioid system, increasing susceptibility to pain. By increasing the excitatory neurotransmission of glutamate, estrogens may increase the likelihood of migraine aura.

== Stress ==
The headache trigger that people are most aware of is stress, ranking second to hormonal factors for women and first in reports for men. Psychological best practices for addressing stress as a possible migraine trigger include relaxation therapy, biofeedback, and cognitive behavioral therapy (CBT). Activities such as relaxation therapy are more likely to be effective when used as a routine part of daily life or to address incidents of stress, rather than during the pain phase of a migraine attack.

== Sleep ==
Migraineurs report a variety of sleep-related issues as possible triggers. These include undersleeping, irregular sleep, frequent night-time waking, and oversleeping. Those who experience chronic migraine may be less likely to maintain consistent sleep habits than those who experience episodic migraines. Jet-lag, shift work, and other disruptions of circadian rhythms may increase migraines. Changes in migraine frequency have been reported in relation to changes between daylight saving time and standard time.

Sleep habits are negatively affected by factors such as air quality and exposure to ambient and indoor pollutants. A nationwide study of household fuel use in China found that those using solid fuel rather than cleaner fuel were more likely to develop migraines; those who switched from solid fuels to cleaner fuels showed a lower risk of migraines. However, those who used solid fuel but reported good sleep duration were not at a significantly higher risk for migraines, suggesting that sleep played a protective role. Sleep hygiene improvements and maintaining a consistent sleep schedule are among the most frequently recommended migraine management techniques.

== Diet ==
Fasting or missing meals are commonly perceived triggers for migraines, and dietary modifications are a frequent management technique. Missing meals like breakfast can reduce brain glucose levels, leading to hypoglycemia and triggering the release of stress hormones like cortisol and adrenaline, which can affect migraines. Irregular meals are particularly strong predictors of attacks for those experiencing chronic migraines. Eating balanced meals at consistent times and hydrating well can help prevent migraines and lessen migraine symptoms.

A wide variety of specific foods and drinks have been reported as possible triggers, including alcohol, coffee, chocolate, cheese, processed meats, monosodium glutamate (MSG), fatty foods, nuts, citrus fruits, and aspartame. Mechanisms of action have been proposed for some of the commonly reported foods and drinks, such as red and white wine, hot dogs, and chocolate. Tyramine, which is naturally present in some alcoholic beverages, most cheeses, processed meats, and other foods. may trigger migraine symptoms in some individuals. Tyramine is present at low levels in chocolate, but the chemistry of chocolate and the effects of its components on migraine are complex. In some cases, chocolate may be beneficial by helping to prevent inflammatory responses. MSG has been reported as a trigger for migraine in some individuals, but whether or not there is a causative relationship continues to be debated.

People may experience food cravings as a result of changes in brain activity during the prodromal phase of migraine. Reports that foods such as chocolate are triggers may actually reflect an increased desire for such foods as an early symptom of migraine attacks.

== Sensory sensitivity ==
Sensitivity to light (photophobia), sensitivity to sound (phonophobia), and sensitivity to smells (osmophobia) are often reported as migraine triggers. Some migraineurs may also report sensitivity to touch (allodynia). Neuroimaging and neurophysiological studies show changes in sensory thresholds related to sensitivity to light, sound and smell and to pain perception. Patient reports of sensitivity triggers may be early symptoms in the prodrome phase of a migraine attack. People often deal with migraine attacks by seeking a dark and quiet space, and limiting further sensory stimulation, including movement, light, sounds, touch, or smells.

=== Light ===
Sensitivity to light is a common symptom in migraine. Discomfort is associated with four categories of stimulation: bright light, flickering light, pattern, and color. While the retina of the eye also may be involved, processes in the cerebral cortex of the brain are increasingly seen as explaining discomfort from visual stimulation.

People have been shown to have different thresholds for discomfort from stimuli. During migraine, stimulation can provoke a hyperexcitable cortical response involving specific subsets of neurons. Both the thresholds at which a response occurs and the size of the response may be involved. For example, those with a more sensitive discomfort glare threshold have been shown to display greater activity in the cuneus, lingual gyri, and superior parietal lobules in response to peripheral lights. Photophobia may reflect individual differences in homeostatic response to stimuli, in which cortical hyper-excitability is further aggravated by visual stimulation. Those who are less sensitive to light may better reduce discomfort and avoid over-stimulation. It has been suggested that migraineurs may experience dysfunction in inhibitory mechanisms, have difficulty habituating to ongoing stimuli, and even become sensitized to such stimuli.

Strategies for reducing discomfort may include staying in a darkened room, wearing sunglasses or hats to avoid direct sunlight and minimize glare, using fluorescent light filters to soften and diffuse light and reduce flicker, using green lights in preference to other colors, and using anti-glare filters with computers. Evaluating workspace ergonomics and using suitable chairs and proper posture while working may also be helpful.

=== Sound ===
Migraineurs frequently report hypersensitivity to sound. Research indicates that they generally may have lower hearing thresholds and lower discomfort thresholds for sounds than non-migraineurs, not just during migraine attacks. Migraineurs also experience lower hearing thresholds than usual during headaches. Lower hearing threshold correlates with headache frequency, and with frequency of auditory, visual, and tactile triggers. Phonophobia in migraineurs correlates with higher brainstem neuronal excitability. There is some evidence suggesting that migraineurs may react equally or more strongly to repeated stimuli (potentiation), rather than becoming accustomed to it (habituation).

=== Smell ===
Migraineurs may report symptoms related to sense of smell, such as increased aversion to normally unoffensive smells or a heightened awareness of smell. This is a possible diagnostic marker of migraine, distinguishing it from other types of headaches. It is more often observed in people with a longer history of migraines and greater migraine-related impairment. This may suggest that sensitivity to stimuli increases over time. Migraineurs who experience scent-related symptoms are more likely to experience insomnia, depression, fatigue, and neuropathic pain, and to report lower quality of life than those without osmophobia.

The brain processes smells through the olfactory, trigeminal, and pheromone systems. There is evidence that different odors may activate different brain regions. Reported trigger smells have been grouped into six general product categories: oil derivatives and others; fetid odors; cooking smells; shampoos and conditioners; cleaning products; and perfumes, insecticides, and rose scent. Perfumes were the smells most frequently reported in connection with migraine attacks. Those with chronic migraines appear more likely than those with episodic migraines to be sensitive to floral scents. Strategies for reducing scent exposure include using fragrance-free products, improving ventilation and air quality, wearing masks, and using air cleaners.

== Weather and air quality ==
Migraines have been reported to be triggered by changes in weather conditions such as temperature, ambient pressure, and humidity, but studies have shown mixed results. Air quality may be a related environmental factor, as is season. A study of adult patients in Be'er Sheva, Israel examined interactions between ambient air pollution, climatic factors, and migraines. Pollutants analyzed included NO_{2}, SO_{2}, PM_{2.5}, and PM_{10} among others. Meteorologic parameters included solar radiation, relative humidity, and temperature.

Short-term exposures to NO_{2} and solar radiation were associated with an increase in migraine-related emergency treatment. Cumulative exposures to NO_{2} and to PM_{2.5} were associated with greater use of migraine-related medication. Temperature and humidity were secondary factors modulating the short-term effects of pollutants: high temperatures and low humidity in the summer increased NO_{2} risk, while cold and humid winter conditions increased effects of PM_{2.5}.
