= Cortical spreading depression =

Type of evoked potential

Animation of cortical spreading depression

Cortical spreading depression seen using intrinsic optical signal imaging in gyrencephalic brain. Speed 50x.

Hemodynamic changes in a swine brain observed after MCA occlusion in IOS. This sequence is sped up 50× to better show the SDs to human vision. Each frame has had a reference image taken 40 seconds before subtracted from it. First we see the initial area of change at the exact moment where the 3 MCAs are occluded. The area is highlighted with a white line. Later we see the signal produced by SDs.

Cortical spreading depression (CSD) or spreading depolarization (SD) is a wave of electrophysiological hyperactivity followed by a wave of inhibition. Spreading depolarization describes a phenomenon characterized by the appearance of depolarization waves of the neurons and neuroglia that propagates across the cortex at a velocity of 1.5–9.5 mm/min.

CSD can be induced by hypoxia and may cause neuronal death in energy-compromised tissue. CSD has also been implicated in migraine aura, where the condition is assumed to ascend from well-nourished tissue; this type of CSD is typically benign, although patients may have a higher chance of developing a stroke.

Spreading depolarization within brainstem tissues regulating functions crucial for life has been implicated in sudden unexpected death in epilepsy, by way of ion channel mutations such as those seen in Dravet syndrome, a particularly severe form of childhood epilepsy that appears to carry an unusually high risk of SUDEP (sudden unexpected death in epilepsy).

Although the terms cortical spreading depression and spreading depolarization are often used as synonyms, a study found spreading depolarizations can produce variable effects on cortical activity in humans and rats, ranging from depressed to booming activity depending on SD depth.

== Uses of the term ==
Neuroscientists use the term cortical spreading depression to represent at least one of the following cortical processes:

- The spreading of a self-propagating wave of cellular depolarization in the cerebral cortex.
- The spreading of a wave of ischemia passing through an area of cortex.
- The spreading of a wave of vasoconstriction following vasodilation and prolonged sustained vasoconstriction of contiguous cortical arterioles.

The scintillating scotoma of migraine in humans may be related to the neurophysiologic phenomenon termed the spreading depression of Leão.

Increased extracellular potassium ion concentration and excitatory glutamate contribute to the initiation and propagation of cortical spreading depression, which is a key event underlying migraine aura.

Chronic daily administration of migraine prophylactic drugs (topiramate, valproate, propranolol, amitriptyline, and methysergide) dose-dependently suppressed frequency of CSD induced by continuous cortical application of 1 M KCl solution. Additionally, lamotrigine (a drug with specific anti-aura action, but no efficacy in migraine in general) has a marked suppressive effect which correlates with its rather selective action on the migraine aura. Valproate and riboflavin were shown to have no effect on the triggering of cortical spreading depression though they are effective in migraine without aura. Taken together, these results are compatible with a causal role of cortical spreading depression in migraine with aura, but not in migraine without aura.

The folded structure of the cerebral cortex is capable of irregular and complex CSD propagation patterns. The irregularities of the folded cortex and the vasculature promote the presence of re-entrance waves, such as spirals and reverberating waves. The expansion of the wave then is less predictable and it is affected by the concentration of different molecules and gradients on the cortex.

Its triggers and propagation mechanisms, as well as clinical manifestations of CSD, are a therapeutic target to reduce brain damage after a stroke or brain lesion.

== See also ==
- Transient ischemic attack
- Aristides Leão
