= Migraine =

Disorder resulting in recurrent moderate–severe headaches

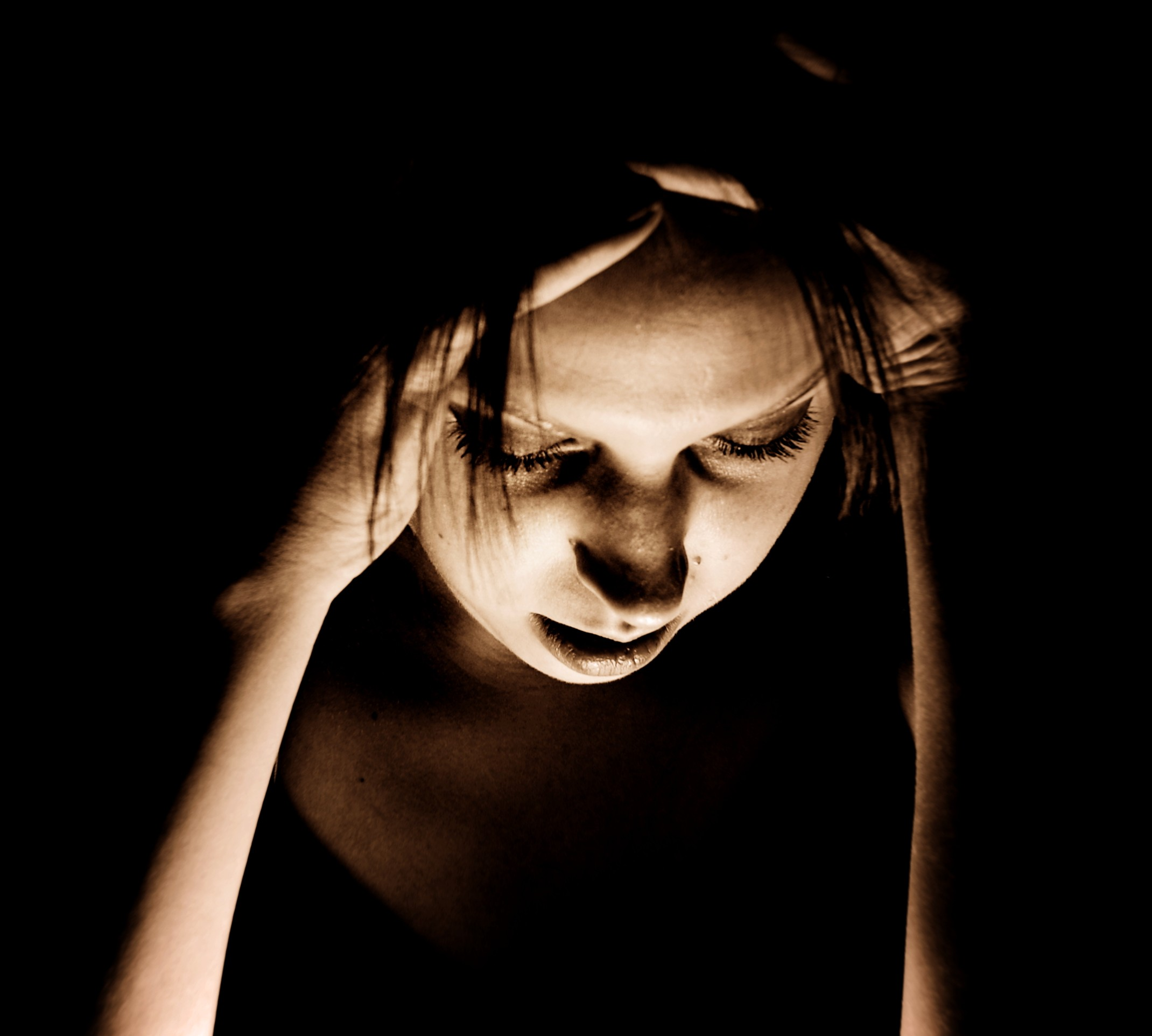
- Woman with migraine headache
- Pronunciation: US: UK: /ˈmaɪɡreɪn/, UK also /ˈmiː-/
- Specialty: Neurology
- Symptoms: Headaches coupled with sensory disturbances such as nausea, sensitivity to light, sound, and smell
- Usual onset: Often around puberty
- Duration: Recurrent, long term
- Causes: Environmental and genetic
- Risk factors: Family history, female sex
- Differential diagnosis: Subarachnoid hemorrhage, venous thrombosis, idiopathic intracranial hypertension, brain tumor, tension headache, cluster headache
- Prevention: Propranolol, amitriptyline, topiramate, gepants
- Medication: Ibuprofen, paracetamol (acetaminophen), triptans, gepants
- Prevalence: ~14%

Migraine is a neurological disorder that causes moderate-to-severe headaches. The pain often affects one side of the head, but can affect both. It is generally associated with nausea, light sensitivity and sound sensitivity. Other symptoms may include dizziness, vomiting, and difficulty thinking. In some cases, a migraine attack begins with a period of sensory disturbance known as an aura. Some people experience occasional attacks, while others have frequent headaches. In some cases, frequent use of pain medications may lead to medication overuse headache.

Triggers can include lack of sleep, disrupted sleep, skipped meals, and hormonal fluctuations. Migraine is believed to result from a combination of genetic, environmental, and neurological factors that affect the activity of nerve cells and chemical signals in the brain. Migraine attacks are theorized to occur when the brain exceeds an individual's sensitivity threshold. The subsequent pain phase of a migraine attack may be linked to increased activity in the pain pathway of the brain, with heightened blood flow and transmission of pain signals.

Managing migraine includes lifestyle changes to identify and manage possible triggers, and can include stress management, improving sleep habits, eating regularly, and exercising. Treatment for acute mild to moderate attacks begins with over-the-counter pain relievers such as ibuprofen and paracetamol. Triptans are recommended as a first-line therapy for moderate to severe attacks. Gepants are also effective, and are used when triptans are ineffective or not suitable. Anti-nausea medications are used for migraine-related nausea. Several medications can help prevent migraines. Preventive medications include gepants, but also beta blockers, anticonvulsants and certain antidepressants. Opioids should generally not be used.

Approximately 14% (1.16 billion) of people have a migraine headache in a given year. It is the third-most disabling condition affecting the nervous system and one of the most common causes of disability. Women experience more and longer migraines than men, and higher disability related to migraines, beginning in puberty. Migraines often start occurring after the first menstrual period, increasing in frequency over time, peaking during perimenopause, and tending to decrease following menopause. From age 30 to 50, up to four times as many women experience migraine attacks as men.

== Signs and symptoms ==
Migraines typically present as recurrent, mostly one-sided, pulsating headaches, along with heightened sensitivity to light, sound, and other sensory stimuli. The severity of pain, duration of the headache, and frequency of attacks vary. Symptoms may last for hours or days, seriously affecting quality of life. Migraine attacks can be described in terms of four stages or phases, which may not all be experienced.

- The premonitory phase or prodrome, generally defined as the 48 hours preceding the pain phase.
- Aura, reversible neurological disturbances (often visual) lasting 5–60 min, generally near onset of the pain phase. These auras are reported by about 30% of migraineurs.
- The pain phase, also known as the headache phase.
- The postdrome, effects following the end of the pain phase of an attack.

About 30% of people living with migraine experience episodes with aura. Women are more likely than men to experience migraine without aura.

A migraine attack lasting longer than 72 hours despite treatment is known as status migrainosus. This condition can lead to complications like dehydration due to vomiting or lack of oral fluid intake, and interfere with the taking of oral medication. Patients may require emergency room or hospital-level care.

Migraine is associated with neuropsychiatric disorders including major depression, bipolar disorder, anxiety disorders, obsessive–compulsive disorder, and sleep disorders. Shared neurobiological mechanisms may underlie multiple conditions. Co-occurrence of depression seems higher among those who experience aura compared to individuals who do not.

=== Prodrome phase ===
The prodrome, or premonitory phase, of migraine is generally defined as the 48 hours preceding the pain or aura phases of an attack. Estimates of how often prodromal symptoms occur vary widely. Around 29% of people with migraine in population-based studies report at least one premonitory symptom. Amongst individuals who attend headache clinics, around 66% of people report premonitory symptoms. Symptoms may vary widely, and can include altered mood, irritability, depression or euphoria, fatigue, craving for certain food(s), difficulty speaking or reading, yawning, stiff muscles (especially in the neck), constipation or diarrhea, and sensitivity to smells or noise. Premonitory symptoms may occur in both migraine without aura and migraine with aura.

=== Aura phase ===
Enhancements reminiscent of a zigzag fort structure	Negative scotoma, loss of awareness of local structures
Positive scotoma, local perception of additional structures	Mostly one-sided loss of perception

Aura is a 5–60 minute neurological event that generally occurs just before the onset of the headache. Symptoms can be visual, sensory, or motor in nature. Visual effects occur most frequently, in as many as 99% of cases involving aura. In rare cases known as persistent aura, aura symptoms may remain after 60 minutes.

Visual disturbances often consist of a scintillating scotoma or flickering in someone's field of vision that may interfere with their ability to read or drive. This typically starts near the center of vision and then spreads out to the sides with jagged or zigzagging lines. Lines are usually black and white, but may also appear colored. Some people lose part of their field of vision, while others experience blurring.

Sensory auras are the second most common type of aura; they occur in 30–40% of people with auras. A feeling of pins-and-needles may begin on one side in the hand and arm and spread to the nose and mouth area on the same side. Numbness usually occurs after the tingling has passed, with a loss of position sense. Other symptoms of the aura phase can include speech or language disturbances, world spinning, and, less commonly, motor problems. Motor symptoms indicate a hemiplegic migraine, and weakness often lasts longer than one hour unlike other auras.

Aura may occur without a subsequent headache, which is called a migraine aura without headache. It may also be referred to as a "silent migraine", though this term is discouraged as it may downplay symptoms, and because there are more specific terms available. Symptoms such as visual disturbance, vision loss, alterations in color perception, and sensitivity to light, sound, and odors can still interfere with normal activity, even when there is no pain.

=== Pain phase ===
Classically, a migraine headache occurs on one side and throbs with moderate to severe intensity. The throbbing is not in phase with the person's pulse. In around 40% of cases, the pain may affect both sides of the head. The pain phase usually lasts 4 to 72 hours in adults. Children and young people more often have shorter headaches with pain on both sides.

Pain is frequently accompanied by nausea, vomiting, sensitivity to light, sensitivity to sound, sensitivity to smells, fatigue, and irritability. Many prefer a dark and quiet environment and seek to avoid stimuli to which they are sensitive. Nausea has been reported by almost 90% of people who self-report with migraine, and vomiting has been reported in from 28% to 70% of patients. Other symptoms may include blurred vision, symptoms affecting the sinuses and nasal passages such as nasal stuffiness, diarrhea, neck pain, and swelling or tenderness of the scalp. In rare cases called migraine with brainstem aura, neurological symptoms such as a sense of the world spinning, light-headedness, and confusion may affect both sides of the body.

During the pain phase, motion and physical activity may increase pain. Migraineurs are likely to decrease physical activity during this time. However, the effects of physical activity on migraine are complex. Regular moderate exercise may reduce the frequency of migraine attacks.

=== Postdrome ===
The migraine postdrome, sometimes referred to as the "migraine hangover", is the collection of symptoms that occur after the acute headache has ceased. The International Classification of Headache Disorders (ICHD-3) defines this as the 48 hours after the pain ceases. Common symptoms include tiredness, difficulty concentrating, mood changes, and thirst. Other symptoms reported include dizziness and euphoria.

== Causes ==
Migraines are believed to result from a mix of genetic, environmental, and neurological factors. Migraine runs in families, with heritability estimates of 34–64%, but this rarely reflects a single gene defect. Rather, a variety of genetic factors that mostly relate to the nervous system and blood vessels may raise migraine risk. Migraine often occurs along with conditions such as depression, anxiety, and bipolar disorder, which may have a bidirectional relationship (either one can worsen the other). Shared genetic and neurobiological mechanisms likely contribute to risk factors underlying multiple conditions.

=== Genetics ===
Studies of twin adults indicate a 0.36 to 0.48 genetic influence on the likelihood of developing migraine. However, few studies examine non-European populations or distinguish between migraine with aura and migraine without aura. It is clear from family and population studies that migraine is a complex disorder, where numerous genetic risk variants exist, and where each variant increases the risk of migraine marginally. It is also known that having several of these risk variants increases the risk by a small to moderate amount.

Single gene disorders that result in migraine are rare. One of these is known as familial hemiplegic migraine, a type of migraine with aura, which is inherited in an autosomal dominant fashion. Three main genes are involved in familial hemiplegic migraine via ion transport: CACNA1A, ATP1A2, and SCN1A.

Another genetic disorder that has been associated with migraine is CADASIL syndrome (cerebral autosomal dominant arteriopathy with subcortical infarcts and leukoencephalopathy). Despite some similarities in symptoms, ICHD-3 recommends using the diagnosis "headache attributed to CADASIL" (code 6.8.1) rather than migraine with aura (MA) or migraine without aura (MO) (codes 1.1 and 1.2). The TRPM8 gene, which codes for a cation channel, has been linked to migraine. One meta-analysis found a protective effect from angiotensin converting enzyme polymorphisms on migraine.

The common forms of migraine are polygenetic, where common variants of numerous genes contribute to the predisposition for migraine. These genes can be placed in three categories: genes that increase the risk of migraine in general, those that specifically increase risk for migraine with aura, and those that specifically increase risk for migraine without aura. Three of these genes, CALCA, CALCB, and HTR1F, are already targets for migraine specific treatments. Five genes are specific to risk of migraine with aura, PALMD, ABO, LRRK2, CACNA1A and PRRT2, and 13 genes are specific to risk of migraine without aura. Using the accumulated genetic risk of common variations to calculate a so-called polygenetic risk score, it is possible to assess, for example, the treatment response to triptans.

=== Triggers ===
Each trigger increases the risk that a migraine starts

A migraine trigger is anything that increases the sensitivity of the brain to migraines. The activity of nerve cells and chemical signals in the brain is affected by genetic, environmental, and neurological factors which interact. Once physical and chemical stimuli exceed an individual's sensitivity threshold, further neurological changes can lead to increased activity in the pain pathway of the brain, with heightened blood flow and transmission of pain signals.

Categories of potential migraine triggers include emotions, nutrition, sleep, hormones, weather, environmental factors (noise, smells, lights), and strenuous movement. Internal migraine triggers such as hormones, stress, disturbed sleep, and fasting affect the body's ability to maintain a stable state. External migraine triggers such as temperature, noises, and odors can change how the body reacts to sensory information. Air pollution, in particular nitrous oxide, carbon monoxide, and particulate matter, appears to increase migraine risk.

Determining when something truly acts as a causal trigger, as opposed to being a symptom of already occurring changes in the brain, is an ongoing area of research. In some cases, factors reported as triggers, such as sensory sensitivities, food cravings, and mood changes, may instead be symptoms in the early (prodromal) phase of migraine. Relationships between triggers are complex and may be bidirectional. For example, people with migraine are more likely to become anxious and depressed, but people with anxiety and depression also have a higher risk of becoming affected by migraine.

The most frequently reported migraine trigger for women is hormonal variation, followed by stress for both women and men. Disrupted sleep, fasting, missing meals, dehydration, and sensory overstimulation are also commonly reported triggers. There is strong evidence that hormonal changes, stress, quality of sleep, and fasting are causally related to migraine attacks. These "catalyst triggers" may increase activity in the hypothalamus or trigeminal system of the brain until it exceeds the brain's migraine threshold. From puberty onwards, women experience migraine attacks more frequently and with greater severity than men, particularly for migraine without aura. The incidence of attacks of migraine without aura is strongly related to hormonal fluctuations in estrogen, both monthly and across a woman's lifespan.

Keeping the body's internal environment stable and consistent appears to protect the brain's migraine sensitivity threshold, while disruption and stresses may make it more likely for the brain to go past its sensitivity threshold. Lifestyle changes that support stability, such as regular sleep, regular meals, and stress management, can help to prevent migraines. Whether a possible trigger is an actual cause or an early symptom, it may be possible to reduce discomfort by managing exposure to sensory stimuli such as smells, lights, sound, or touch.

== Mechanism ==
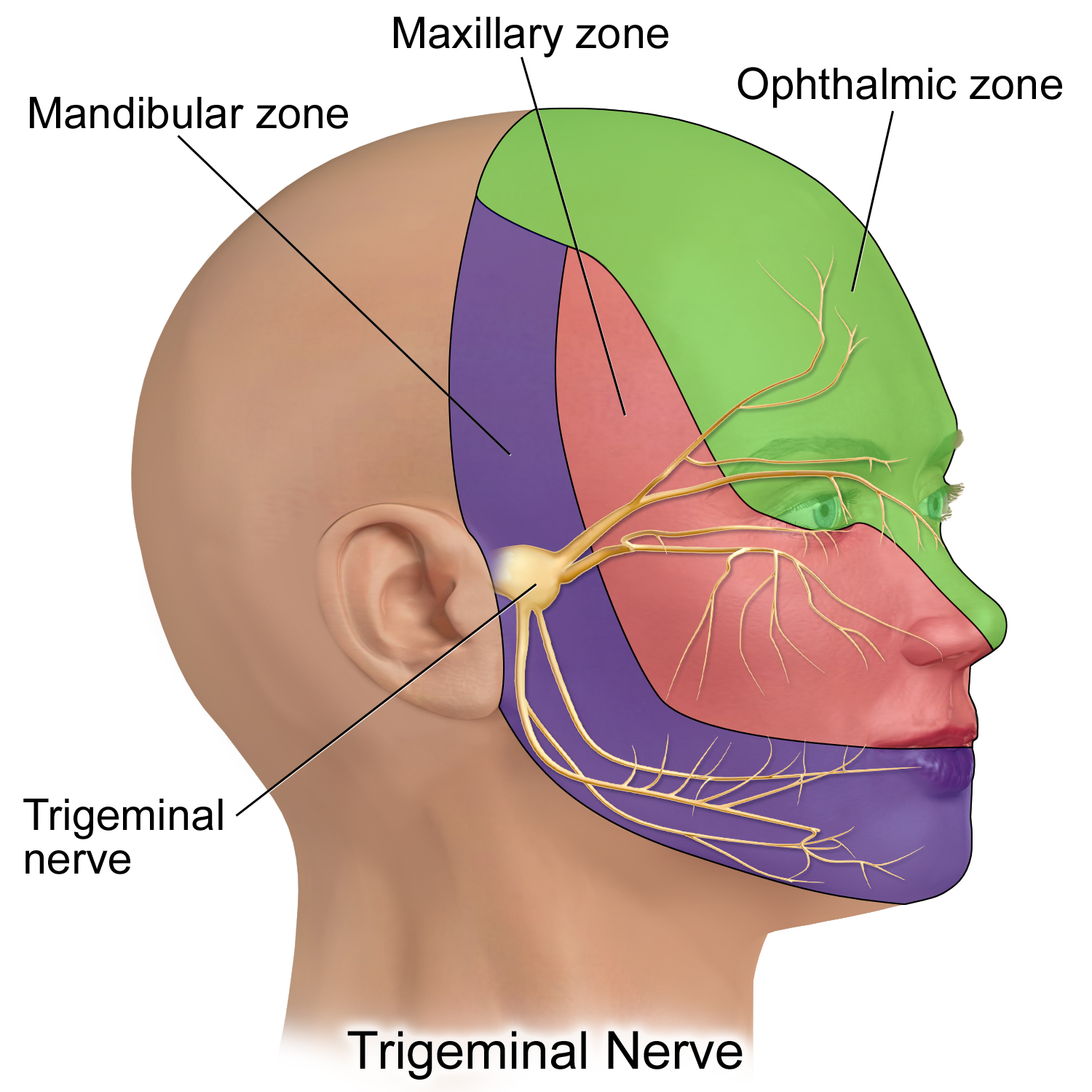
The location of the trigeminal nerve

Migraine is a complex pain disorder involving both blood vessels and neurons within the meninges, the brain's protective layers. The system involved is sometimes referred to as the trigeminovascular system. The trigeminal nerve, located within the dura mater, carries sensory information about pain, touch, heat, and cold from the face to the brain. The hypothalamus receives input from the trigeminal nerve and can modulate its activity. Individuals with migraine appear to experience impairments in cortical habituation, a process which would normally decrease the brain's response to repetitive sensory stimuli.

Migraine attacks may begin with disruption in the hypothalamus and limbic system. Gradually increasing hypothalamic activity has been observed in the period leading up to a migraine attack, followed by a disruption or collapse of hypothalamic connectivity to the limbic system during an attack. Disruption of the connection between the hypothalamus and limbic system may increase activity in the pain pathway from the trigeminal nerve to the brain, resulting in a migraine attack.

The meninges, particularly the dura mater, are rich in pain-sensitive nerve endings. Sensory information travels along trigeminal nerve fibers to cell bodies located within the trigeminal ganglion. Axons of the trigeminal ganglion (TG) neurons enter the brainstem and travel to the trigeminal nucleus caudalis (TNC).

The activity of calcitonin gene-related peptide (CGRP) in the meninges is linked to migraine. CGRP is released from both the trigeminal ganglion (TG) and the trigeminal nucleus caudalis (TNC) in response to trigeminal nerve activation. CGRP activates receptors on meningeal blood vessels, causing dilation and changes in blood flow. CGRP also activates specialized nerve endings in the dura mater (nociceptors) that transmit pain signals to the central nervous system. Increased neuronal activity in the trigeminal pain pathway reaches higher cortical pain regions via the brainstem, midbrain, and thalamus.

Stimulation of the trigeminal nerve may result in the release of neuropeptides such as CGRP from nerve endings, release of inflammatory mediators from mast cells, vasodilation of cerebral and dural blood vessels, neurogenic inflammation, and the transmission of pain signals via nerves in the meninges. Cerebrospinal fluid may play a role in migraine by conveying signals from the brain to overlying pain-sensitive meningeal tissues, including the dura mater.

Animation of cortical spreading depression

Mechanisms in migraine with and without aura differ. The experience of aura in migraine is associated with cortical spreading depression (CSD) at the onset of a migraine attack. In cortical spreading depression, a wave of depolarization propagates across the cerebral cortex, followed by suppression of spontaneous neuronal activity. Physiologically, CSD involves an influx of sodium and calcium ions in concentrations that overwhelm the cell membrane's transport capability. Dysregulation of electrolyte concentration and disruption of homeostasis then spread to other cortical regions.

Incidence of migraines may increase over time, evolving from episodic migraine to chronic migraine. Overuse of acute pain medications may hasten this, and is a risk factor in developing medication overuse headache.

== Diagnosis ==
The diagnosis of a migraine is based on signs and symptoms. A headache calendar is a useful diagnostic tool for tracking the date, duration, and symptoms of headaches. Migraines can be classified by whether the patient experiences an aura (MA) or not (MO) and headache frequency (episodic or chronic).

According to the International Classification of Headache Disorders (ICHD-3), migraine diagnosis is primarily clinical and based on identifying characteristic patterns of headache features and associated symptoms rather than laboratory or imaging findings. Neuroimaging tests are not necessary to diagnose migraine, but may be used to find other causes of headaches in those whose examination and history do not confirm a migraine diagnosis. The American Headache Society's guideline recommends neuroimaging only when "red-flag" symptoms or abnormal neurological findings are present, noting that routine imaging is unnecessary for patients who already meet clinical criteria for migraine.

The diagnosis of migraine without aura, according to the International Headache Society, can be made according to the "5, 4, 3, 2, 1 criteria", which is as follows:

- Five or more attacks – for migraine with aura, two attacks are sufficient for diagnosis.
- Four hours to three days in duration
- Two or more of the following:
  - Unilateral (affecting one side of the head)
  - Pulsating
  - Moderate or severe pain intensity
  - Worsened by or causing avoidance of routine physical activity
- One or more of the following:
  - Nausea and/or vomiting
  - Sensitivity to both light (photophobia) and sound (phonophobia)

If someone experiences two of the following: sensitivity to light, nausea, or inability to work or study for a day, the diagnosis is more likely. In those with four out of five of the following: pulsating headache, duration of 4–72 hours, pain on one side of the head, nausea, or symptoms that interfere with the person's life, the probability that this is a migraine attack is 92%. In those with fewer than three of these symptoms, the probability is 17%.

=== Classification ===
Migraine was first comprehensively classified in 1988, when the International Headache Society (IHS) began its classification of headache disorders. The IHS updated its classification of headaches in 2004, and a third version was published in 2018. According to this classification, migraine is a primary headache disorder along with tension headaches and cluster headaches.

The classification of migraine includes six broad categories:

- Migraine without aura involves migraine headaches that are not accompanied by aura.
- Migraine with aura usually involves migraine headaches accompanied by aura. Less commonly, aura can occur without a headache or with a nonmigraine headache.
  - Migraine with typical aura
  - Migraine with brainstem aura (MBA), where a headache and aura are accompanied by difficulty speaking, world spinning, ringing in ears, or several other brainstem-related symptoms, but not motor weakness.
  - Hemiplegic migraine and sporadic hemiplegic migraine, in which a person has migraine with aura and with accompanying motor weakness. If a close relative has had the same condition, it is called "familial"; otherwise, it is called "sporadic".
  - Retinal migraine (which is distinct from visual or optical migraine) involves migraine headaches accompanied by visual disturbances or even temporary blindness in one eye.
- Chronic migraine is defined as headaches occurring on at least 15 days per month for more than three months, with at least eight days per month fulfilling criteria for migraine.
- Episodic syndromes that may be associated with migraine are often noted in childhood. These syndromes include cyclical vomiting (occasional intense periods of vomiting), abdominal migraine (abdominal pain, usually accompanied by nausea), and benign paroxysmal vertigo of childhood (occasional attacks of vertigo).
- Complications of migraine describe migraine headaches and/or auras that are unusually long or unusually frequent, or associated with a seizure or brain lesion.
- Probable migraine describes conditions that have some characteristics of migraine, but where there is not enough evidence to diagnose it as migraine with certainty.

Menstrual migraines are those that either only occur associated with a menstrual period, or occur predictably around menstrual period alongside migraines during other parts of the menstrual cycle. They typically occur in migraines without aura. They are often longer than other migraine attacks, and associated with more nausea.

=== Abdominal migraine ===
Abdominal migraine is most frequently diagnosed in children, but occasionally in adults. Diagnostic criteria for abdominal migraine are outlined by both the Rome IV and ICHD III classification systems. Criteria include repeated, acute, paroxysmal attacks of abdominal pain that may be associated with nausea and vomiting. Attacks last for at least 1 hour and interfere with normal life. Average attack duration has been reported as 17 hours. Abdominal migraine often occurs in people with either a personal or family history of typical migraine, and children may develop typical migraine later in life. Abdominal migraine, migraine, and cyclical vomiting syndrome share common symptoms.

=== Differential diagnosis ===
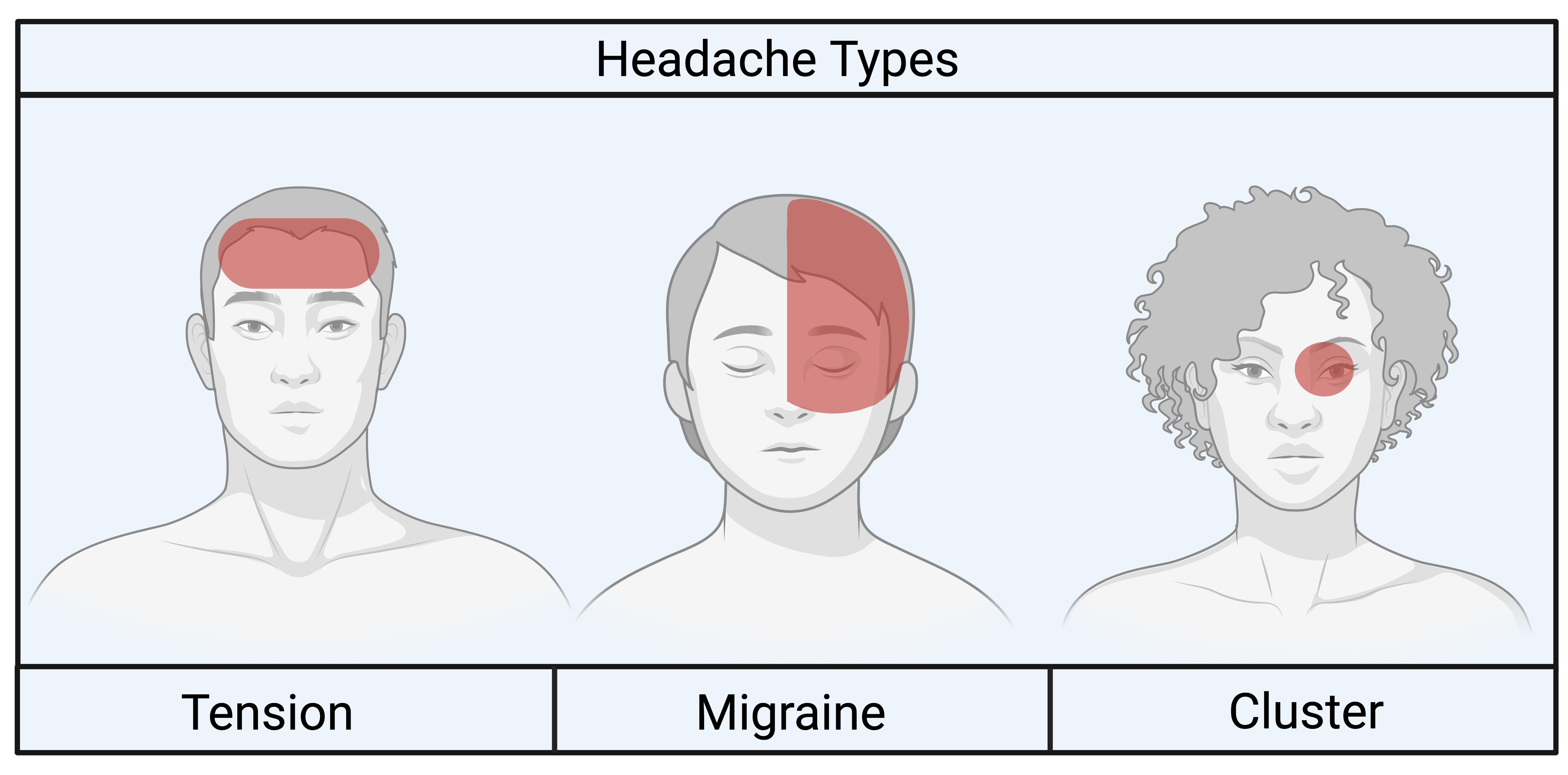
Pain distribution of tension, migraine and cluster headaches

Other conditions that can cause similar symptoms to a migraine headache include temporal arteritis, cluster headaches, acute glaucoma, meningitis and subarachnoid hemorrhage. Temporal arteritis typically occurs in people over 50 years old and presents with tenderness over the temple. Cluster headache presents with one-sided nose stuffiness, tears, and severe pain around the eyes. Acute glaucoma is associated with vision problems. Meningitis is associated with fever. Subarachnoid hemorrhage is associated with a very fast onset. Tension headaches typically occur on both sides, are not pounding, and are less disabling.

Those with stable headaches that meet criteria for migraine should not receive neuroimaging to look for other intracranial disease.

== Management ==
Management of migraine includes both prevention of migraine attacks and acute treatment. Preventive (prophylactic) treatment can be given to reduce the frequency and severity of future attacks. Acute (abortive) treatment attempts to diminish or reverse the progression of a headache that has already started. Measures for reducing and avoiding triggers may also be beneficial. Headache tracking, using a headache diary or smartphone app, is a standard self-management tool used to monitor frequency of headache occurrence, associated symptoms or triggers, and effects of treatments.

=== Prevention ===
A migraine management plan often includes lifestyle modifications to cope with migraine triggers and reduce the impact of comorbidities. Recommended lifestyle modifications support a consistent lifestyle, through regular sleep patterns, regular eating, staying hydrated, managing stress, engaging in moderate exercise, and maintaining a healthy body weight. Avoiding dietary triggers and caffeine overuse may also be recommended. Improving sleep patterns may be particularly helpful in reducing migraine frequency for adults with chronic migraines.

Behavioral techniques that have been used in the treatment of migraines include Cognitive Behavioral Therapy (CBT), relaxation training, biofeedback, acceptance and commitment therapy (ACT), as well as mindfulness-based therapies. These treatments can reduce migraine frequency both on their own and in combination with other treatment options. For children and adolescents, CBT and biofeedback strategies are effective in decreasing the frequency and intensity of migraines. These techniques often include relaxation methods and promotion of long-term management without medication side effects, which is emphasized for younger individuals.

A variety of possible diets have been proposed, including ketogenic diet, Mediterranean diet, DASH diet, and high intakes of fruits, vegetables, legumes, and oil seeds. Evidence supporting interventions such as transcranial magnetic stimulation and transcutaneous supraorbital nerve stimulation remains limited. Some supplements may help prevent migraine frequency or severity, including riboflavin (vitamin B_{2}), vitamin D, magnesium, alpha-lipoic acid, and coenzyme Q10. Omega-3 fatty acids do not seem to help.

The chemical formula for atogepant, a gepant that is used as first line treatment for the prevention of migraines

Preventive medications may be recommended for those experiencing frequent or severe migraines. In particular, preventative drugs are recommended for individuals that experience more than 4 migraines per month, as well as for those where acute treatment does not work well. Preventive medications include beta blockers, topiramate, and calcitonin gene related peptides (CGRP) inhibitors like erenumab and galcanezumab. According to the European Headache Federation and American Headache Society, CGRP targeting therapies—which include both gepants and monoclonal antibodies—are a first-line option for migraine prevention. Botox injections can also help prevent migraine attacks, and are sometimes used for chronic migraines when other medications fail.

For predicable menstrual migraines, a further option for prevention exist: the use of triptans in the two days before the period starts until three days after, or on the day the migraine is anticipated. This approach can be combined with other preventative drugs.

=== Acute treatment ===
Acute treatments are most effective when administered early in an attack. Initial recommended treatment for acute mild to moderate attacks is with over-the-counter (OTC) medications such as ibuprofen (Advil, Motrin) and paracetamol (acetaminophen, Tylenol) for pain. Triptans are recommended as a first-line therapy for moderate to severe attacks. The approval of CGRP inhibitors (gepants) is seen as a major advance in migraine treatment. Anti-nausea medications are used as a second-line treatment for migraine-related nausea. Ergotamines may be used by those experiencing headaches that do not respond to over-the-counter pain medications.

Opioids should not be prescribed, as higher doses of opioids are linked to medication overuse headache (MOH) and increased risk of progression from episodic to chronic migraines. MOH can also be caused by frequent use of simple pain relievers such as paracetamol (more than 15 days a month), or by the use of triptans for more than 10 days a month. The UK National Institute for Care and Health Excellence recommends an abrupt pause of one month in the use of triptans and simple pain relievers in case of MOH; this may lead to a short-term increase in symptoms.

Corticosteroids such as dexamethasone have been used to treat patients with an attack lasting more than three days, severe baseline disability, or refractory or recurrent headaches.

Systematic review and network meta-analysis have been used to compare the effectiveness of medications for acute migraine attacks in adults. Results suggest that triptans, ditans, and gepants are all associated with reduced pain at 2 hours, with triptans being the most successful. Gepants were the least likely to cause adverse events, with some triptans having a higher risk than gepants, and ditans having the highest risk among all treatments.

== Prognosis ==
The prognosis for migraine differs from person to person. Often, it improves with age. In women, attacks can stop or diminish after menopause and also during the second and third trimester of pregnancy. A substantial number of people with the condition remain undiagnosed; fewer than half of people with migraine seek medical care. Severe migraine ranks in the highest category of disability, according to the World Health Organization, and the bulk of disability burden is due to chronic (as opposed to episodic) migraine.

Repeated experiences of pain, including migraine pain, cause functional and structural changes in the brain. About 2.5% of people with episodic migraines develop chronic migraine each year, while few people with chronic migraine revert back to episodic migraines. People with highly frequent episodic migraines are at high risk in particular.

Migraine with aura is associated with an increased risk of ischemic stroke, myocardial infarction, coronary artery disease, and coronary artery dissection (SCAD). This association may reflect shared underlying mechanisms of migraine with aura and cardiovascular disease. Women who experience migraine with aura and use estrogen-containing oral contraceptives have a higher risk of ischemic stroke. In contrast, migraine, generally, and migraine without aura, does not appear to be related to increased risk of stroke or heart disease. Preventive therapy, particularly for those with migraine with aura, may prevent associated strokes.

People with migraine, particularly women, may develop higher than average numbers of white matter brain lesions of unclear significance.

== Epidemiology ==
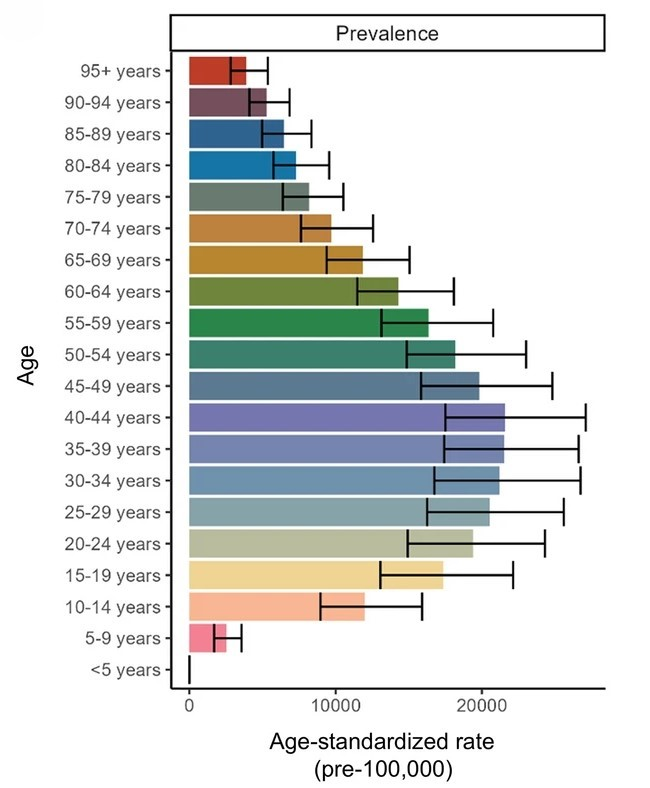
Age-standardised prevalence rate of migraine in 2021

Migraine is common, with around 33% of women and 18% of men affected at some point in their lifetime. According to the Global Burden of Disease Study 2021, approximately 14% (1.16 billion) of people worldwide are affected by migraine in a given year.

In the United States, about 6% of men and 18% of women experience a migraine attack in a given year, with a lifetime risk of about 18% and 43%, respectively. In Europe, migraine affects 12–28% of people at some point in their lives, with about 6–15% of adult men and 14–35% of adult women getting at least one attack yearly. Rates of migraine are slightly lower in Asia and Africa than in Western countries. Chronic migraine occurs in approximately 1.4–2.2% of the population; and affects around 8% of individuals with migraines.

Onset can be at any age, but prevalence rises sharply around puberty, and remains high until declining after age 50. Before puberty, boys and girls are equally impacted, with around 5% of children experiencing migraine attacks. From puberty onwards, women experience migraine attacks at greater rates than men. From age 30 to 50, up to 4 times as many women experience migraine attacks as men; this is most pronounced in migraine without aura.

== Economic impact ==
Migraines are a significant source of both medical costs and lost productivity. It has been estimated that migraine is the most costly headache disorder in the European Community, costing €50–111 billion per year in 2012. Most of the costs were due to lost work. As of 2017, in the United States, total costs were estimated at US$78 billion, with the cost per person multiple times bigger for those with chronic migraines. In those who do attend work during a migraine attack, effectiveness is decreased by around a third. Negative effects also frequently occur for a person's family.

== Research ==
Compared to the disease burden of migraine, the amount of healthy life years lost, the field is severely underfunded. In the US in 2019, migraine research got just 7.8% of the funding expected based on its burden. In Europe, it was the most underfunded brain disease when compared to its economic impact.

== History ==
=== Etymology ===
The word "migraine" derives from the Greek ἡμικρᾱνίᾱ (hēmikrāníā), "pain in half of the head", from ἡμι- (hēmi-), 'half' and κρᾱνίον (krāníon), 'skull'. The term was adopted into Latin as "hemicrania" and later entered medieval French as "hemigrania" and "migrania", eventually developing into English "migraine" in the 15th century, with earlier spellings including "megrim" and "meagrim". In English, megrim originally referred to general malaise, low spirits, and a notion of a passing idea, as well as severe headaches. Related terms appear in several languages, including the Persian "shaquiqheh", used by medieval physicians for half-head pain, and the Spanish "migraña", linked to the Arabic "jaqueca". Egyptologist Lutz Popko has suggested that the Greek term may itself have been influenced by an Egyptian expression meaning "half of the head".

=== Antiquity ===
Ancient Babylonian texts describe symptoms resembling migraine, which were believed to be caused by supernatural forces and were treated using spiritual or religious practices. A description consistent with migraine is contained in the Ebers Papyrus, written around 1500 BCE in ancient Egypt. Trepanation, a surgical procedure involving drilling or scraping an opening into the skull, has been practiced since the Neolithic period, although there is little evidence that it was specifically used to treat headaches or migraine.

During the Greco-Roman era, explanations for migraine shifted from supernatural beliefs to the theory of the four humors. Writings from the Hippocratic school of medicine described the visual aura that can precede headache and noted that vomiting could provide partial relief. Headaches were thought to result from an imbalance of these bodily fluids. A description by Aretaeus of Cappadocia classified headaches into cephalalgia, cephalea, and heterocrania, while Galen of Pergamon adapted this latter term to produce "hemicrania", from which the modern word migraine is derived. He proposed that the pain arose from the meninges and blood vessels of the head. The mystical visions described by Hildegard von Bingen as "reflections of the living light", have been interpreted by some scholars as being consistent with the visual aura experienced during migraine attacks.

=== 17th–18th centuries ===
By the 17th century, physicians suggested that migraine pain originated in the meninges, the outer covering of the skull, or the blood vessels of the head. Thomas Willis proposed that migraine developed when narrowing of the brain's blood vessels was followed by their widening. In the 18th century, Samuel-Auguste Tissot and John Fothergill produced detailed clinical descriptions of migraine, including visual symptoms that are now recognised as migraine aura.

=== 19th century ===
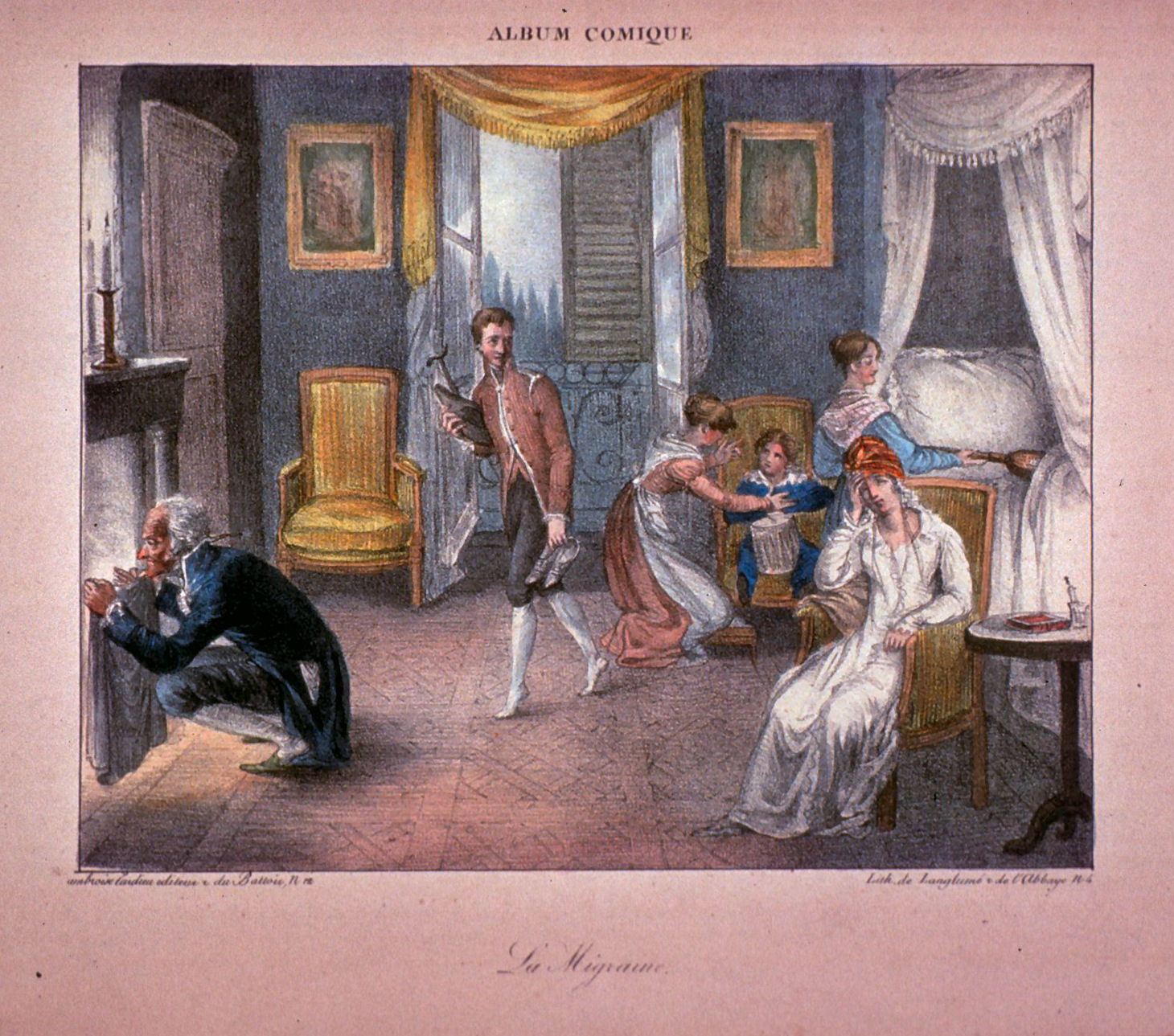
The migraine

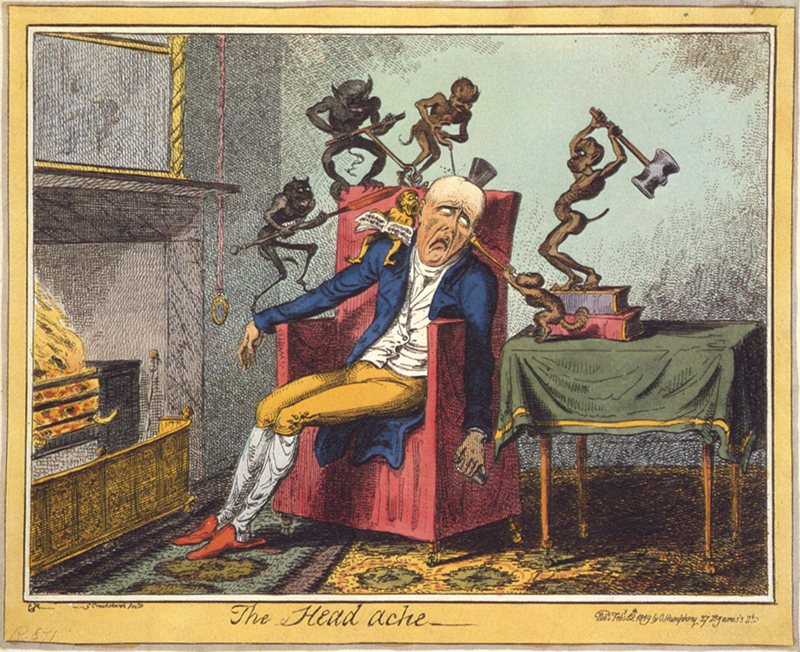
The Head Ache, George Cruikshank (1819)

By the 19th century, it had become increasingly recognised that migraine was not always confined to one side of the head. Consequently, the historical term hemicrania came to encompass conditions now classified as migraine, although it may also have included other headache disorders. In 1887, the French librarian Louis Hyacinthe Thomas distinguished two forms of migraine, "migraine ophthalmique" and "migraine vulgaire", corresponding broadly to what are now known as migraine with aura and migraine without aura.

Although numerous treatments for migraine had been attempted, it was not until 1868 that ergot was introduced as a treatment. Canadian physician William Osler, included a chapter on migraine in his 1892 The Principles and Practice of Medicine, the gold standard medical text of the day. He described the treatments commonly used by physicians, including ergot, cannabis, bromides, caffeine, and pain-relieving medicines including antipyrin and phenacetin.

=== 20th century ===
During the 20th century, Harold Wolff's vascular theory linked migraine pain to the widening of blood vessels. Ergotamine, one of the principal alkaloids responsible for its antimigraine effects, was isolated from the ergot fungus in 1918. It was first used to treat migraine in 1925. Methysergide was developed in 1959. The first triptan, sumatriptan, was developed in 1988. Other discoveries identified serotonin as an important chemical involved in migraine, leading to the development of serotonin receptor agonists for treatment. Later, the discovery of calcitonin gene-related peptide (CGRP) improved understanding of migraine and led to the development of targeted CGRP-based medicines.

== See also ==
- List of investigational headache and migraine drugs
