= Aura (symptom) =

Symptom of epilepsy and migraine

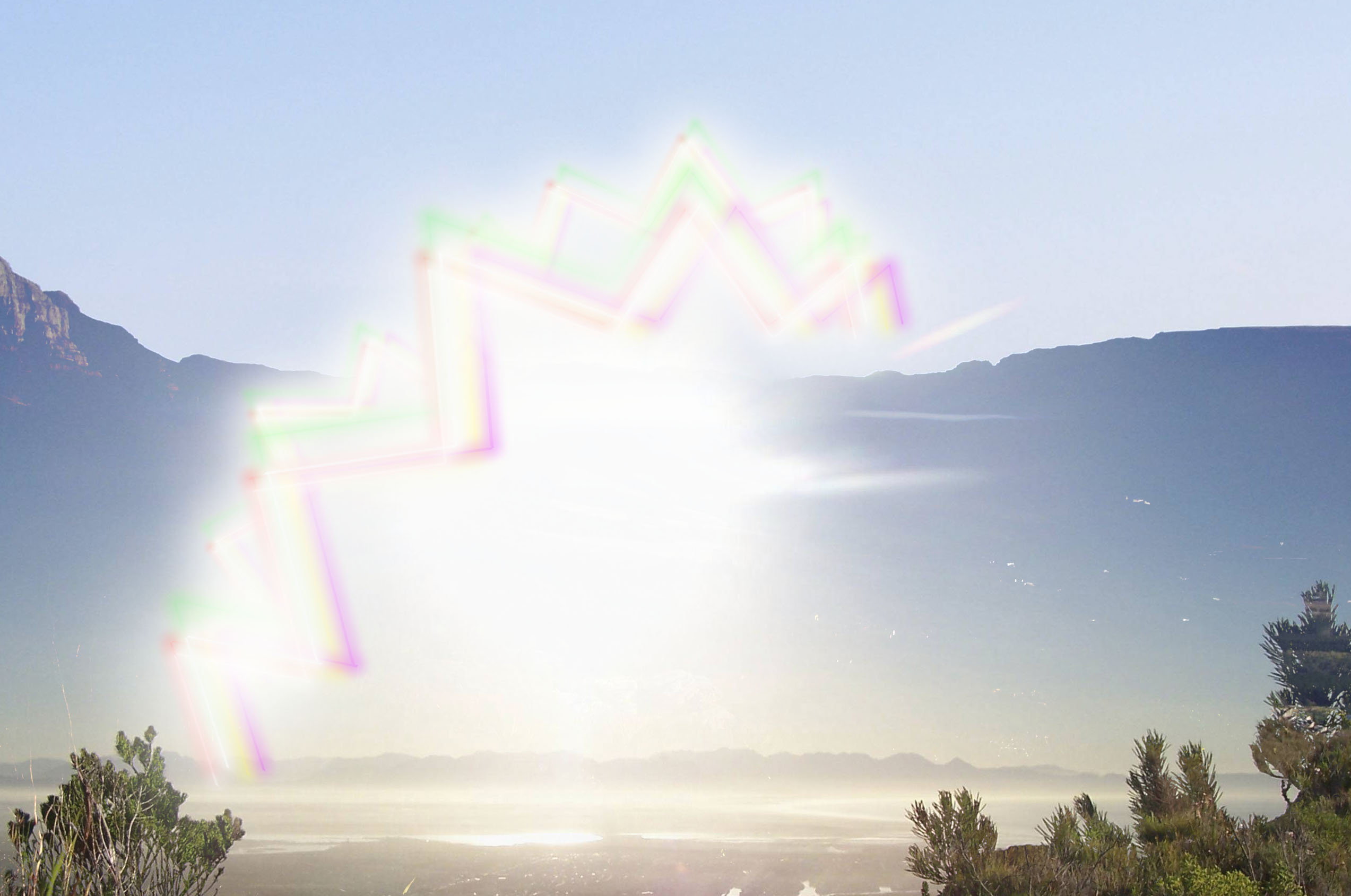
- Artist's depiction of zig-zag lines experienced as part of a migraine aura phenomenon
- Specialty: Neurology, neuro-ophthalmology
- Types: Scintillating scotoma
- Differential diagnosis: Persistent aura without infarction, retinal migraine, visual snow

An aura is a perceptual disturbance experienced by some with epilepsy or migraine. An epileptic aura is a form of minor seizure.

Epileptic and migraine auras are due to the involvement of specific areas of the brain, which are those that determine the symptoms of the aura. Therefore, if the visual area is affected, the aura will consist of visual symptoms, while if a tactile sensory one, then tactile sensory symptoms will occur.

Epileptic auras are subjective sensory or psychic phenomena due to a focal seizure, i.e. a seizure that originates from that area of the brain responsible for the function which then expresses itself with the symptoms of the aura. It is important because it makes it clear where the alteration causing the seizure is located. An epileptic aura is in most cases followed by other manifestations of a seizure, for example a convulsion, since the epileptic discharge spreads to other parts of the brain. Rarely it remains isolated. Auras, when they occur, allow some people who have epilepsy time to prevent injury to themselves and/or others when they lose consciousness.

== Migraine ==
The aura of migraine is visual in the vast majority of cases because dysfunction starts from the visual cortex. The aura is usually followed, after a time varying from minutes to an hour, by the migraine headache. However, the migraine aura can manifest itself without being followed by headache. The aura can stay for the duration of the migraine; depending on the type of aura, it can leave the person disoriented and confused. It is common for people with migraines to experience more than one type of aura during the migraine. Some people have the same type of aura every time.

Auras can also be confused with sudden onset of panic, panic attacks or anxiety attacks, which creates difficulties in diagnosis. The differential diagnosis of patients who experience symptoms of paresthesias, derealization, dizziness, chest pain, tremors, and palpitations can be challenging.

== Seizures ==
An epileptic aura is the consequence of the activation of functional cortex by abnormal neuronal discharge. In addition to being a warning sign for an impending seizure, the nature of an aura can give insight into the localization and lateralization of the seizure or migraine.

The most common auras include motor, somatosensory, visual, and auditory symptoms. The activation in the brain during an aura can spread through multiple regions continuously or discontinuously, on the same side or to both sides.

Auras are particularly common in focal seizures. If the motor cortex is involved in the overstimulation of neurons, motor auras can result. Likewise, somatosensory auras (such as tingling, numbness, and pain) can result if the somatosensory cortex is involved. When the primary somatosensory cortex is activated, more discrete parts on the opposite side of the body and the secondary somatosensory areas result in symptoms ipsilateral to the seizure focus.

Visual auras can be simple or complex. Simple visual symptoms can include static, flashing, or moving lights/shapes/colors caused mostly by abnormal activity in the primary visual cortex. Complex visual auras can include people, scenes, and objects which results from stimulation of the temporo-occipital junction and is lateralized to one hemifield. Auditory auras can also be simple (ringing, buzzing) or complex (voices, music). Simple symptoms can occur from activation in the primary auditory cortex and complex symptoms from the temporo-occipital cortex at the location of the auditory association areas.

== Examples ==
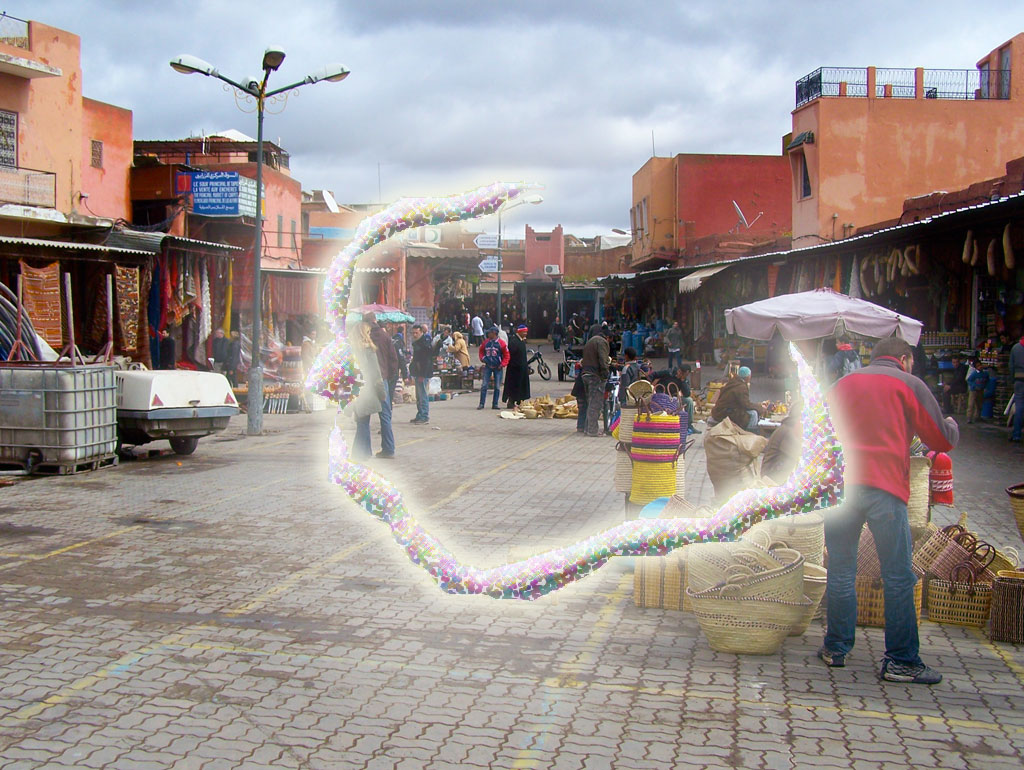
Artist's depiction of scintillating scotoma

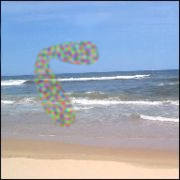
Example of a scintillating scotoma aura with each dot or line flickering

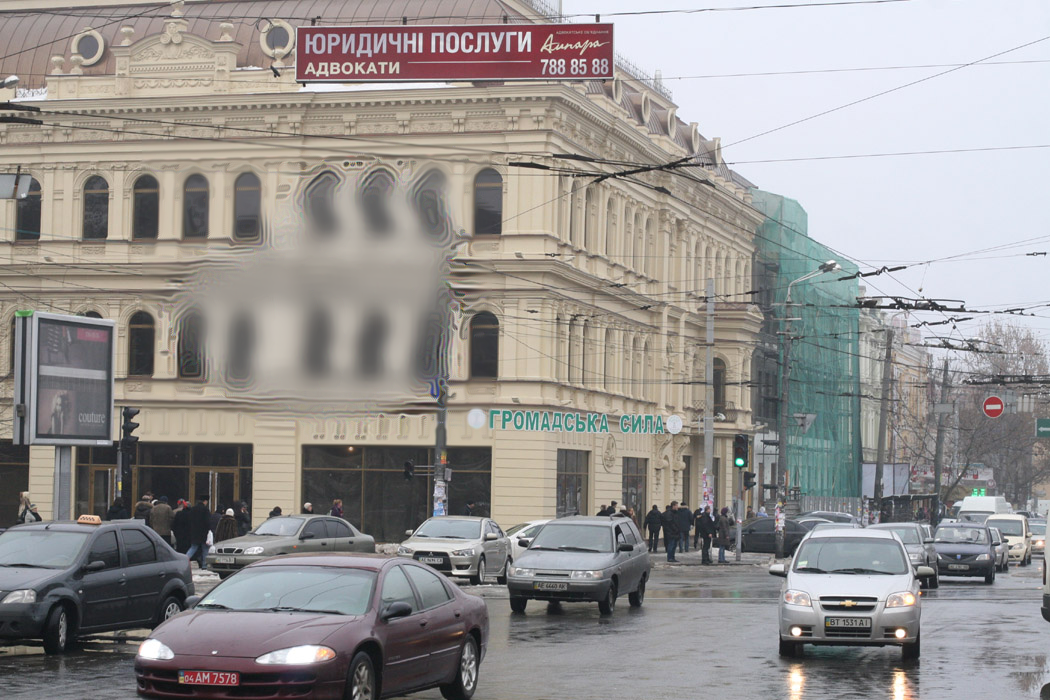
Example of scintillating scotoma showing an obscured/distorted area bordered with colors

An aura sensation can include one or a combination of the following:

=== Visual changes ===
- Bright lights and blobs
- Zigzag lines
- Distortions in the size or shape of objects
- Vibrating visual field
- Scintillating scotoma
  - Shimmering, pulsating patches, often curved
  - Tunnel vision
- Scotoma
  - Blind or dark spots
  - Curtain like effect over one eye
  - Slowly spreading spots
- Kaleidoscope effects
- Temporary blindness in one or both eyes
- Heightened sensitivity to light

=== Auditory changes ===
- Hearing voices or sounds that do not exist: auditory hallucinations
- Modification of voices or sounds in the environment: buzzing, tremolo, amplitude modulation or other modulations
- Heightened sensitivity to hearing
- Vestibular dysfunction causing vertigo

=== Other sensations ===
- Strange smells (phantosmia) or tastes (gustatory hallucinations)
- Heightened sensitivity to smell
- Synesthesia
- Déjà vu or jamais vu
- Cephalic aura, a perception of movement of the head or inside the head
- Abdominal aura, such as an epigastric rising sensation
- Nausea
- Numbness or tingling (paresthesia)
- Weakness on one side of the body (hemiparesis)
- Feelings of being separated from or floating above one's body (dissociation)
- Feeling of overheating and sudden perspiration
- Inability to speak (aphasia) or slurred speech

== See also ==
- Focal seizure – Seizures which affect only one brain hemisphere
- Hallucination – Perception that only seems real
- Persistent aura without infarction
- Synesthesia – Neurological condition involving the crossing of senses
- CADASIL – Genetic disorder
- Retinal migraine – Medical condition of the eye
- Photopsia – Presence of perceived flashes of light in one's field of vision
