= Nelson Rising =

American businessman (1941–2023)

- Born: August 27, 1941; Queens, New York, U.S.
- Died: February 9, 2023 (aged 81); Pasadena, California, U.S.
- Board member of: Federal Reserve Bank of San Francisco; Doheny Eye Institute; Jules Stein Eye Institute

Nelson Rising (August 27, 1941 – February 9, 2023) was an American businessman, chairman and CEO of Rising Realty Partners and chairman emeritus of the Real Estate Roundtable. He was also the former president and CEO of MPG Office Trust, chairman of the board of the Federal Reserve Bank of San Francisco, and on the boards of Doheny Eye Institute and Jules Stein Eye Institute.

== Early life and education ==
Rising was born in Queens, New York, and grew up in Glendale, California, where he attended Glendale High School, where he was an All-CIF football player in 1959. He received a scholarship to UCLA, where he received his B.A. in economics and graduated with honors in 1963. In 1967 he attended UCLA Law School, where he earned his Juris Doctor.

== Business career ==
Rising's professional career began as an associate at O’Melveny & Myers, where he was mentored by diplomat and former U.S. Secretary of State Warren Christopher. He took a leave of absence from the firm to successfully manage the 1970 campaign of John Tunney who defeated a Republican incumbent in the U.S. Senate.

His real estate career officially began in 1973 when he became president of the 5,000-acre Coto de Caza resort community in southeast Orange County. Throughout the growth of his real estate career, Rising stayed involved in California politics, serving as chairman of Tom Bradley’s campaign for mayor in 1973, 1977, and 1981 and Bradley’s campaign for governor in 1982. Rising developed projects throughout the United States and became a senior partner at Maguire Thomas Partners. Rising was responsible for the Library Square development, which included the U.S. Bank Tower and the Gas Company Tower. He was partner-in-charge of both the Library Square development as well as Playa Vista, one of the largest and most complicated multipurpose developments in the history of Los Angeles.

In 1994, Rising became CEO of Catellus Development Corporation. Throughout the 11 year tenure he witnessed the company evolve from a railroad land company, to a diversified development company and eventually become a real estate investment trust. During his tenure, investors were granted a compounded return of 538%. There is now a street named after Nelson Rising in Mission Bay, San Francisco called Nelson Rising Lane. Rising was named Dealmaker of the Year in 2005 at San Francisco’s Business Times’ annual Real Estate Deals of the Year event. Rising was chairman and CEO of Rising Realty Partners, LLC., which he co-founded with his son, Christopher; chairman emeritus of the Real Estate Roundtable; and chairman of the Grand Avenue Committee.

Rising chaired Governor Jerry Brown’s three-member panel to dissolve the Los Angeles Community Redevelopment Agency in 2012. He served on the board of directors and executive committee of The Irvine Company and the boards of the Trust Company of the West (now TCW Group) and Foley Timber & Land Company as well. He was a lifetime member and former trustee who served on executive committees of the California Institute of Technology, and a trustee of the W.M. Keck Foundation

He is credited with having "spearheaded iconic developments that transformed neighborhoods across California". Cushman & Wakefield chairman John Cushman, who also works closely with Rising's son, Christopher, called Rising "a genius in terms of dealing with people" with mediation skills that would transform "confusion and chaos and translate it into common sense and bring people back to the table who were yelling" to forge consensus among multiple stakeholders from government agencies and citizen groups for large-scale urban projects.

== Personal life ==
Nelson Rising was married to Sharon Lynne Sanders. They married in 1963, in Fresno, California. They had three children, Christopher, Corinne and Jonathan Mathew Rising. He and his wife resided in La Cañada Flintridge, California.

Rising died from complications of Alzheimer's disease in Pasadena, California, on February 9, 2023. He was 81.
