= Irvine–Gass syndrome =

Irvine–Gass Syndrome
- Other names: Pseudophakic cystoid macular edema, Postcataract CME
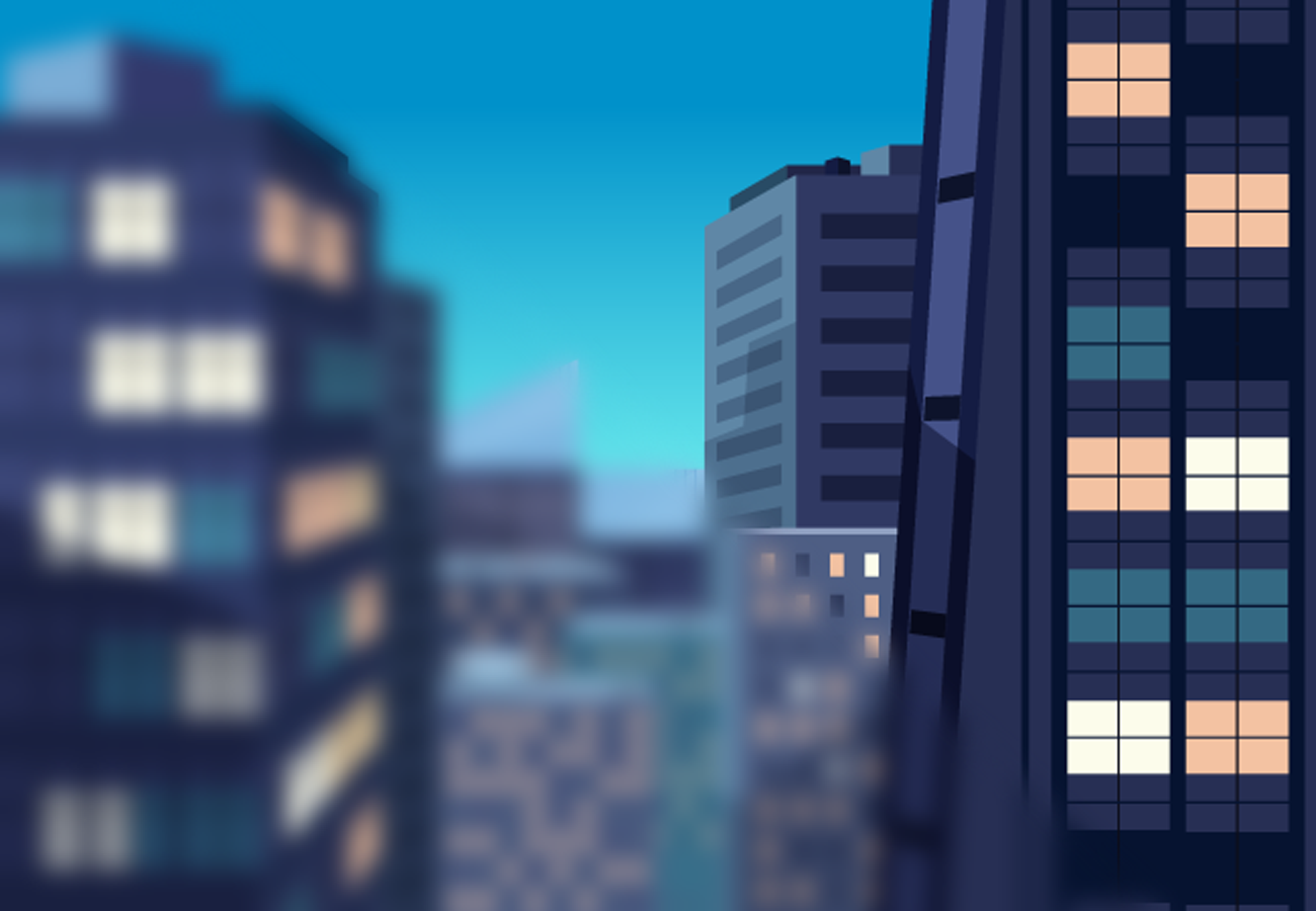
- One side of the image is clear and the other side is blurred depicting how a patient with Irvine-Gass syndrome views something with blurry eyesight
- Specialty: Ophthalmology

Irvine–Gass syndrome, pseudophakic cystoid macular edema or postcataract CME is one of the most common causes of visual loss after cataract surgery. The syndrome is named in honor of S. Rodman Irvine and J. Donald M. Gass.

The incidence is more common in older types of cataract surgery, where postcataract CME could occur in 20–60% of patients, but with modern cataract surgery, incidence of Irvine–Gass syndrome has reduced significantly.

Replacement of the lens as treatment for cataract can cause pseudophakic macular edema (‘pseudophakia’ means ‘replacement lens’). This could occur as the surgery involved sometimes irritates the retina (and other parts of the eye) causing the capillaries in the retina to dilate and leak fluid into the retina. This is less common today with modern lens replacement techniques.

== Signs and symptoms ==
Most patients have decreased or fuzzy vision.

=== Complications ===
Foveolar photoreceptor damage and permanent vision impairment can arise from multiple remissions and exacerbations of macular edema or from persistent macular edema.

== Causes ==
Irvine–Gass syndrome usually arises after a routine cataract operation.

=== Risk factors ===
A number of systemic conditions have been linked to higher incidence of pseudophakic macular edema. After cataract surgery, patients with diabetes mellitus are generally acknowledged to have an increased risk of macular edema.

A prior history of retinal vein occlusion was the only significant preoperative risk factor in a large retrospective series of 1659 consecutive cataract surgeries.

As one of the etiologic factors thought to contribute to macular edema is the release of prostaglandins. Prostaglandin analog-using patients experienced significantly more anterior chamber flare than non-users in a randomized trial of patients with aphakic and pseudophakic glaucoma.

Epiretinal membrane, uveitis, previous diagnosis of contralateral pseudophakic macular edema and macular holes, intraoperative iris manipulation and intraoperative capsule rupture with or without vitreous loss are other known risk factors.

== Treatment ==
Irvine–Gass Syndrome often resolves without treatment. As a first-line treatment, corticosteroids and topical NSAIDs are frequently used, either alone or in combination. Intravitreal administration of corticosteroids and anti-vascular endothelial growth factor agents may be considered if this approach proves to be ineffective. Pars plana vitrectomy may be an option for eyes with persistent pseudophakic cystoid macular edema and vitreomacular traction.
