= VMA =

VMA or vma may refer to:

== Academies ==
- Visayan Maritime Academy, a private maritime college in the Philippines
- Vojnomedicinska akademija, the transliterated Serbian name for the Military Medical Academy (Serbia)

== Awards ==
- MTV Video Music Awards, American music video awards (1984–present)
- MAD Video Music Awards, Greek music video awards (2004-present)
- Vicky Metcalf Award, a Canadian literary award for writers of children's works

== Medicine ==
- Vanillylmandelic acid, a metabolite in urine which may be measured to diagnose medical disorders
- Vitreomacular adhesion, a disease of the human eye where vitreous gel remains partially attached to the retina

== Other uses ==
- Marine Attack Squadron, a type of aircraft squadron of the United States Marine Corps
- Virgin Mobile Australia, a cellphone provider in Australia
- Martuthunira language, the ISO 639-3 code for an extinct Australian Aboriginal language
