= Kayser–Fleischer ring =

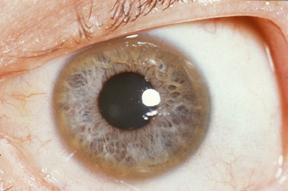
- A Kayser–Fleischer ring in a 32-year-old patient who had longstanding speech difficulties and tremor.
- Specialty: Ophthalmology

Kayser–Fleischer rings (KF rings) are dark rings that appear to encircle the cornea of the eye. They are due to copper deposition in the Descemet's membrane as a result of particular liver diseases. They are named after German ophthalmologists Bernhard Kayser and Bruno Fleischer who first described them in 1902 and 1903. Initially thought to be due to the accumulation of silver, they were first demonstrated to contain copper in 1934.

== Presentation ==
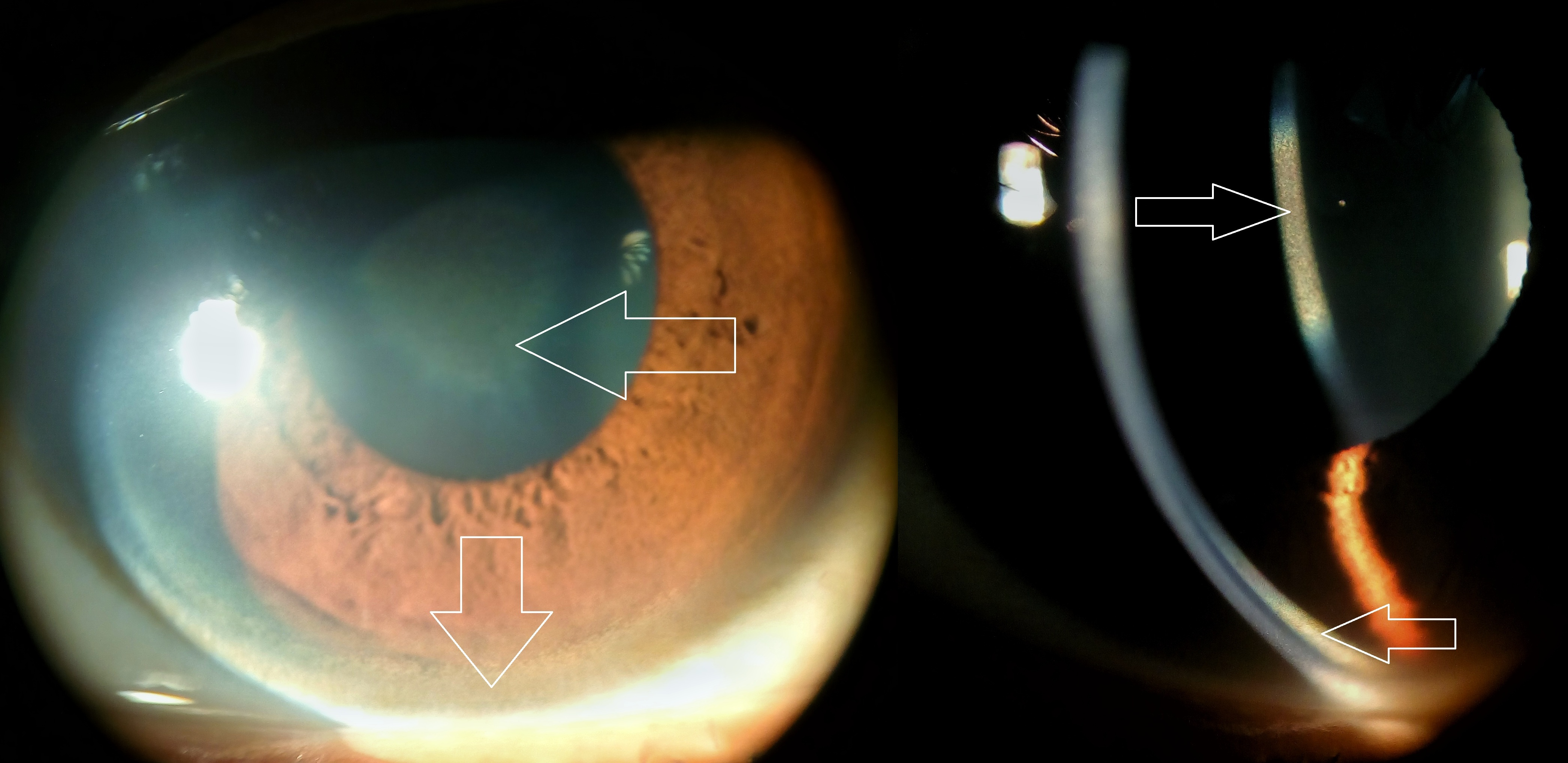
Copper deposition in peripheral Descemet membrane (Kayser–Fleischer ring) and anterior capsule of crystalline lens (sunflower cataract)

The rings, which consist of copper deposits where the cornea meets the sclera, in Descemet's membrane, first appear as a crescent at the top of the cornea. Eventually, a second crescent forms below, at the "six o'clock position", and ultimately completely encircles the cornea.

=== Associations ===
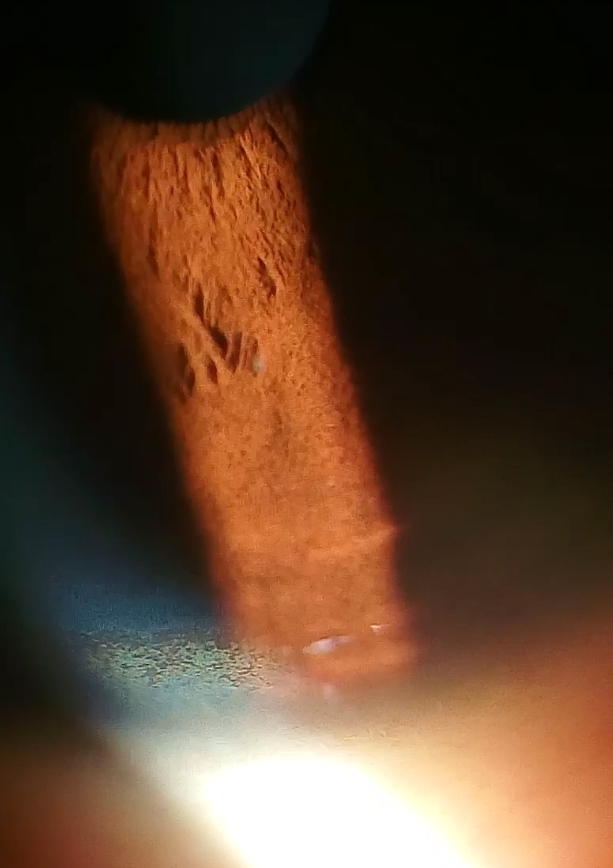
Copper deposition on corneal Descemet's membrane

Kayser–Fleischer rings are a sign of Wilson's disease, which involves abnormal copper handling by the liver resulting in copper accumulation in the body and is characterised by abnormalities of the basal ganglia of the brain, liver cirrhosis, splenomegaly, involuntary movements, muscle rigidity, psychiatric disturbances, dystonia and dysphagia. The combination of neurological symptoms, a low blood ceruloplasmin level and KF rings is diagnostic of Wilson's disease.

Other causes of KF rings are cholestasis (obstruction of the bile ducts), primary biliary cirrhosis and "cryptogenic" cirrhosis (cirrhosis in which no cause can be identified).

== Diagnosis ==
As Kayser–Fleischer rings do not cause any symptoms, it is common for them to be identified during investigations for other medical conditions. In certain situations, they are actively sought; in that case, the early stages may be detected by slit lamp examination before they become visible to the naked eye.

== See also ==
- Fleischer ring
- Hudson–Stahli line
- Limbal ring
