= Bernhard Kayser =

German ophthalmologist (1869–1954)

Bernhard Kayser (6 August 1869, in Bremen – 11 May 1954, in Stuttgart) was a German ophthalmologist.

He studied at Tübingen and Berlin, receiving his doctorate from the University of Berlin in 1893. Afterwards, he worked as an intern in Tübingen and as an assistant physician in Freiburg im Breisgau. He was then employed as a ship's physician by the North German Lloyd Shipping Company and spent 2½ years in Brazil as a general practitioner. He later worked as a physician in Brandenburg and Bremen, during which time, he developed an interest in ophthalmology. In 1903 he became a specialist in ophthalmology and relocated to Stuttgart, where he spent the remainder of his life. For many years he was editor of the essay section of the Klinische Monatsblätter für Augenheilkunde.

Kayser–Fleischer rings are named after him and Bruno Fleischer. Kayser described the condition in a 1902 paper titled Über einen Fall von angeborener grünlicher Verfärbung des Cornea.
