= Ann Coleman =

Ann or Anne Coleman may refer to:

- Anne L. Coleman, American ophthalmologist
- Anne Coleman (tennis), Australian tennis player
- Anne Coleman (author), Canadian writer of the memoir I'll Tell You a Secret
- A. Catrina Coleman (born 1956), Scottish electrical engineer and professor
- Ann Crittenden Coleman (1813–1891), American author and translator
