= Banza =

Banza may refer to:

- M'banza-Kongo, formerly known as São Salvador, the capital of Zaire Province, Angola
- Banza (katydid), a katydid genus endemic to Hawaii
- Banza, Central African Republic, a town near to Karawa, Central African Republic
- An alternative name for the banjo
- Banza, a barangay of Butuan City, Agusan del Norte, Philippines
- Banza, a company that produces noodles with garbanzo beans (or chickpeas)

== People with the surname ==
- Alexandre Banza (1932–1969), Central African military officer and politician
- Céline Banza (born 1997), Congolese singer-songwriter and guitarist
- Chico Banza (born 1998), Angolan footballer
- Jean-Kasongo Banza (1974–2024), Congolese footballer
- Simon Banza (born 1996), Congolese footballer
