= Ron Gallemore =

American ophthalmologist

Ron Paul Gallemore
- Born: December 18, 1964 (age 61); Glendora, California
- Education: University of California, Irvine; University of California, San Francisco
- Years active: 1992–Present
- Known for: Research in the treatment of macular degeneration
- Medical career
- Profession: Surgeon
- Institutions: Retina Macula Institute; Jules Stein Eye Institute
- Sub-specialties: Diseases of the Retina; Macular Degeneration
- Research: Neuroscience; Macular Degeneration

Ron P. Gallemore is a registered ophthalmologist with the American Academy of Ophthalmology involved in research and treatment of diseases of the macula and retina.

== Career ==
Gallemore attained his undergraduate degree from the University of California, Irvine, before going on to complete his M.D. at the School of Medicine at the University of California, San Francisco. He completed his Ph.D. in the field of neuroscience and began a career focusing on the physiology and biophysics of retinal function.

In his progression of training he conducted his internship at the Mercy Hospital and Medical Center in San Diego, before going on to undertake his residency at the Jules Stein Eye Institute at the UCLA Medical Center, Los Angeles, where he later became a clinical instructor. He completed his vitreoretinal surgery fellowship at Duke University under Dr. Robert Machemer, known as the founder of modern vitreoretinal surgery.

Gallemore has been the recipient of numerous awards, including the Heed and Knapp Fellowship award, the Dr. Charles Schepens Award, the Dr. Ron Michels Award, and the Jules Stein Eye Institute Alumni Research Award.

He continues to make contributions in the field of diseases of the retina through research, clinical trials, clinical instruction, and public lectures and appearances. In 2007 he founded the Retina Macula Institute where he is currently the principal doctor and surgeon.

== Publications ==
=== Peer-reviewed papers ===
Gallemore has published 60 peer-reviewed articles listed in Web of Science. His most cited has been the phase II multi-center study, "Verteporfin therapy of subfoveal minimally classic choroidal neovascularization in age-related macular degeneration – 2-year results of a randomized clinical trial." by Greve, MDJ; Hinz, BJ; Schulha, M, et al. Archives of Ophthalmology 123 (4): 448–457 (2005), Cited 70 times as of June 2009.

Other highly cited papers include:

- Gallemore RP, Jumper JM, McCuen BW, Jaffe GJ, Postel EA, Toth (2000). "Diagnosis of vitreoretinal adhesions in macular disease with optical coherence tomography". Retina-the Journal of Retinal and Vitreous Diseases. 20 (2): 115–120. PMID 10783942. Cited 60 times.
- Gallemore RP, Griff ER, Steinberg RH (1988). "Evidence in support of a photoreceptoral origin for the light-peak substance". Investigative Ophthalmology & Visual Science. 29 (4): 566–571. Cited 49 times
- Jaffe GJ, Yang CS, Wang XC, Cousins SW, Gallemore RP, Ashton P (1998). "Intravitreal sustained-release cyclosporine in the treatment of experimental uveitis". Ophthalmology. 105 (1): 46–56. doi:10.1016/S0161-6420(98)91176-9. PMID 9442778. Cited 47 times
- Gallemore RP, Steinberg RH (1990). "Effects of dopamine on the chick retinal-pigment epithelium – membrane-potentials and light-evoked responses". Investigative Ophthalmology & Visual Science. 31 (1): 67–80. Cited 44 times
- Gallemore RP, Steinberg RH (1993). "Light-evoked modulation of basolateral membrane Cl^{−} conductance in chick retinal-pigment epithelium – the light peak and fast oscillation". Journal of Neurophysiology. 70 (4): 1669–1680. doi:10.1152/jn.1993.70.4.1669. PMID 8283222.
- Gallemore RP, Steinberg RH (1989). "Effects of DIDS on the chick retinal-pigment epithelium. 1. Membrane-potentials, apparent resistances, and mechanisms". Journal of Neuroscience. 9 (6): 1968–1976. doi:10.1523/JNEUROSCI.09-06-01968.1989. PMC 6569732. PMID 2723761. Cited 42 times.
- Gallemore RP, Steinberg RH (1989). "Effects of DIDS on the chick retinal-pigment epithelium. 2. Membrane-potentials, apparent resistances, and mechanisms". Journal of Neuroscience. 9 (6): 1977–1984. doi:10.1523/JNEUROSCI.09-06-01977.1989. PMC 6569725. PMID 2723762. Cited 42 times.

=== Book chapters ===
- Hughes, BA, Gallemore, RP and Miller, SS (1998) "Transport mechanisms in the retinal pigment epithelium". In: The retinal pigment epithelium: function and disease. Marmor MF, Wolfensberger TJ, editors. New York: Oxford University Press; p. 103–34.
- Gallemore, RP, Maruiwa, F and Marmor MF (1998) "Clinical electrophysiology of the retinal pigment epithelium". In: M. F. Marmor and T. J. Wolfensberger, eds. The Retinal Pigment Epithelium: Function and Disease.
- Gallemore RP, Hughes BA and Miller SS (1998) "Light-induced responses of the Retinal pigment epithelium". In: M. F. Marmor and T. J. Wolfensberger, eds. The Retinal Pigment Epithelium: Function and Disease.
- Gallemore RP, McCuen B II. (2000) "Silicone oil tamponade in Vitreoretinal surgery". In: S. Ryan ed., Retina, Chapter 127.
