= Marissa Goldberg =

American healthcare executive (born 1951)

- Education: Pepperdine University (BA, MBA)
- Scientific career
- Fields: Ophthalmology
- Workplaces: Doheny Eye Institute; UCLA Stein Eye Institute

Marissa Goldberg is an American healthcare executive. She has served as CEO of the Doheny Eye Institute, a nonprofit ophthalmic research institute affiliated with the UCLA Stein Eye Institute, since 2015.

== Career ==
Goldberg completed an undergraduate degree at Pepperdine University in Malibu, California before attaining an MBA.

She began a career in management in 1981, including at Daniel Freeman Hospital in Inglewood, California and UniHealth in Long Beach, California. Goldberg joined the Doheny Eye Institute in August 1991. She served as CAO, vice president, and COO before being appointed CEO. In 2013, she transitioned Doheny's affiliation with the University of Southern California to UCLA Stein Eye Institute to increase the capacity for research and medical care. She also oversaw the opening of new headquarters in Pasadena, California in 2021.

In 2023, Goldberg was named Non-Profit Executive of the Year at the Los Angeles Business Journal's Non-Profit & Corporate Citizenship Awards.

Goldberg serves on the board of directors for PIH Health, Banza, the Doheny Eye Institute, and the National Alliance for Eye and Vision Research (NAEVR). She also serves as a trustee of the Los Angeles County Arboretum & Botanic Garden.

== Personal life ==
Goldberg is of Hispanic and Latino American descent.
