= Anne L. Coleman =

American ophthalmologist

- Born: Richmond, Virginia
- Occupations: Chair & Director, Stein Eye Institute Affiliation Chair, Doheny Eye Institute

Academic background
- Education: Duke University (BS); University of California, Los Angeles (MS, PhD); Virginia Commonwealth University (MD)

Academic work
- Institutions: UCLA; Stein Eye Institute
- Main interests: Glaucoma Specialist
- Website: https://www.uclahealth.org/news/meet-dr-anne-coleman-director-of-the-ucla-department-of-ophthalmology

Anne Louise Coleman is an American ophthalmologist. She is currently the Chair of the Department of Ophthalmology and Director of the Stein Eye Institute at University of California, Los Angeles.

During her tenure at UCLA, Coleman was the first director of the Hoskins Center for Quality Eye Care and was involved in the development of the IRIS (Intelligent Research in Sight) Registry. She also chaired the Interspecialty Education Committee, the Knowledge-Base Glaucoma Panel, Quality of Care Secretary, and the Pyott Glaucoma Education Center.

== Early life and education ==
Coleman was born and raised in Richmond, Virginia, and graduated from Duke University with her bachelor's degree in chemistry. She then moved to the west coast and enrolled at the University of California, Los Angeles (UCLA) for her graduate degrees. From there, Coleman completed her medical degree from VCU School of Medicine, her fellowship at Johns Hopkins Hospital, and residency at the University of Illinois Hospital & Health Sciences System.

== Career ==
Upon completing her formal education, Coleman was encouraged to accept a faculty position at UCLA by M. Roy Wilson. During her tenure at UCLA, Coleman was the first director of the Hoskins Center for Quality Eye Care and was involved in the development of the IRIS (Intelligent Research in Sight) Registry, the nation's first comprehensive eye disease registry for improved clinical care. She also chaired the Interspecialty Education Committee, the Knowledge-Base Glaucoma Panel, Quality of Care Secretary, and the Pyott Glaucoma Education Center. In 2012, Coleman became the director of the Mobile Eye Clinic and the Jules Stein Eye Institute Center for Community Outreach. While serving in this role, she oversaw the collaboration between the Jules Stein Eye Institute and First 5 LA towards the UCLA Mobile Eye Clinic.

In recognition of her academic achievements, Coleman was elected a member of the National Academy of Medicine (NAM) alongside colleague Kelsey Martin. Her UCLA Mobile Eye Clinic was also honored by the Los Angeles County Medical Association and the Patient Care Foundation of Los Angeles County for exemplary leadership in shaping the future of health care. They were specifically recognized for "improving access to health services and education for children and families in underserved communities". During the COVID-19 pandemic, Coleman became the 124th president of the American Academy of Ophthalmology for a one-year term. In response to the epidemic, Coleman and the Academy leadership issued their first ever statement urging ophthalmologists to cease treatment of patients.

In 2022, Coleman was selected as the Chair of the Department of Ophthalmology, the Director of the University of California, Los Angeles Stein Eye Institute, and Affiliation Chair of the Doheny Eye Institute
