= J. Donald M. Gass =

Biography of ophthomologist (1928 – 2005)

John Donald MacIntyre Gass (2 August 1928, Montague, Prince Edward Island – 26 February 2005, Nashville, Tennessee) was a Canadian-American ophthalmologist, one of the world's leading specialists on diseases of the retina. He was the first to describe many macular diseases.

His father was the prominent tuberculosis specialist R. S. Gass. Donald Gass moved as a child with his family from Canada to Nashville. He received in 1950 his bachelor's degree from Vanderbilt University and then served from 1950 to 1953 in the U.S. Navy as an active line officer during the Korean War. He received in 1957 his M.D. from the Vanderbilt University School of Medicine. Gass was an intern at the University of Iowa Hospitals and Clinics and a resident at the Wilmer Eye Institute at Johns Hopkins Hospital. He then had a fellowship at the Armed Forces Institute of Pathology. He was from 1963 to 1972 an assistant professor and from 1972 to 1995 a full professor at the Bascom Palmer Eye Institute at the University of Miami Medical School. In 1995 he and his wife moved back to Nashville, where he became a professor at the Vanderbilt University School of Medicine.

The book, "Stereoscopic Atlas of Macular Diseases: Diagnosis and Treatment," describes several hundred congenital, infectious, age-related and inflammatory eye diseases. Illustrating those disorders with photographs and drawings, the work is widely known as Gass's Atlas and is now in its fourth edition. In preparing his book, Dr. Gass helped to pioneer the use of fluorescein angiography, a test that traces a vegetable dye injected into blood vessels within the retina, and so reveals signature patterns of leaking and blockage in those vessels. Dr. Gass used that test to characterize the often subtle differences among diseases, combining angiography with other observations in describing the wet form of macular degeneration and refining existing descriptions of other disorders. In 1967, Dr. Gass helped to describe the most common cause of vision impairment that may follow cataract surgery, a type of macular swelling now known as Irvine-Gass syndrome.

He is also well known for his work in finding the link between acute zonal occult outer retinopathy (AZOOR) and other retinal syndromes and in the treatment of diffuse unilateral subacute neuroretinitis. The disease, common in tropical areas, is caused by a worm that gains entrance into the bloodstream, invading the area between the retina and choroid and causing severe vision loss in one eye.

Upon his death he was survived by his wife, three sons, a daughter, and five grandchildren.

== Awards and honors ==
- 1987 — establishment of the Gass Medal in his honor by the Macula Society
- 1999 — Mildred Weisenfeld Award for Excellence in Ophthalmology of the American Association for Research and Vision in Ophthalmology
- 2001 — Helen Keller Prize for Vision Research of the Helen Keller Foundation
- 2004 — Laureate Recognition Award of the American Academy of Ophthalmology

== Selected publications ==
- with Anita Agarwal: Gass' Atlas of Macular Diseases, 5th edition. Volume 1. Elsevier Health Sciences, 2011.
