= Fleischer ring =

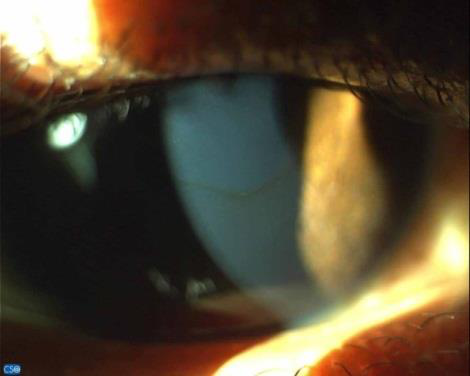
- Fleischer ring in keratoconus, by Mahmoud et al., 2022.
- Differential diagnosis: keratoconus

Fleischer rings are pigmented rings in the peripheral cornea, resulting from iron deposition in basal epithelial cells, in the form of hemosiderin. They are usually yellowish to dark-brown, and may be complete or broken. The rings are best seen using the slit lamp under cobalt blue filter.They are named for Bruno Fleischer.

Fleischer rings are indicative of keratoconus, a degenerative corneal condition that causes the cornea to thin and change to a conic shape.

== Confusion with Kayser–Fleischer rings ==
Some confusion exists between Fleischer rings and Kayser–Fleischer rings. Kayser–Fleischer rings are caused by copper deposits in descemet's membrane of cornea, and are indicative of Wilson's disease, whereas Fleischer rings are caused by iron deposits in basal epithelial cells. One example of a medical condition that can present with Fleischer rings is keratoconus.

== See also ==
- Hudson–Stahli line
- Limbal ring
