= Vitreomacular traction syndrome =

Medical condition affecting the eye

- Symptoms: Loss of sharpness of vision, photopsia, micropsia, metamorphopsia
- Complications: Maculopathies
- Risk factors: Incomplete posterior vitreous detachment, older age, female sex, macular degeneration, diabetic retinopathy, macular edema, retinal vein occlusion
- Diagnostic method: Optical coherence tomography
- Treatment: Vision monitoring, use of Amsler grid, surgery
- Frequency: 22.5 per 100,000

Vitreomacular traction syndrome (VTS) is a medical condition in the eye that is the result of tractional forces (pulling) being placed on the retina. VTS is common in people who have an incomplete posterior vitreous detachment, a type of retinal detachment at the periphery of the retina. In these cases the vitreous is still attached to the retina in some places and this results in a pulling or 'tractional' force that causes VTS that includes lesions on retina.

People with VMT are at a heightened risk of other disorders of the eye including disorders of the macula (maculopathies). Disorders include holes in the macula, cystoid macular edema, and epiretinal membrane formation. These conditions can lead to central vision loss and damage to the retina.

Symptoms of VTS include vision changes (loss of sharpness), flashes of light (photopsia), changes in the size of objects (micropsia), and other visual distortions including metamorphopsia. VTS can be diagnosed using optical coherence tomography to image the retina and visualize the tractional forces that may be present. In addition, imaging with a dynamic B-scan ultrasound may be useful for visualizing the retina. Causes and risk factors of VTS include age, a high degree of myopia or nearsightedness, macular degeneration, diabetic retinopathy, macular edema, and occlusion of the retinal vein.

Treatment for VTS depends on the severity and how much vision is affected. For some people, regular monitoring may be suggested ("wait and see approach"). Monitoring at home includes the suggestion of using an amsler grid daily to detect visual disturbances and regular medical visits with an optometrist or ophthalmologist. There are some VTS cases that will go away without interventions. Surgery may be suggested if the person's vision is threatened. Procedures include a vitrectomy and removal of scar tissue to reduce the tension that is causing the traction on the retina. An appropriately placed gas bubble that is injected into the eye by an ophthalmologist may also be used to treat VTS with the goal of decreasing the tension and traction to reduce VTS.

The incidence of VTS has been estimated to be 22.5 cases for every 100,000 people and it may be slightly more common in women compared to men.

== Signs and symptoms ==
The main symptoms are changes in vision, usually a loss of sharpness, flashes of light (photopsia), changes in the size of objects (micropsia). Other visual distortions including metamorphopsia are also commonly reported.

== Causes ==
The risk of VTS increases with age. Degeneration of the vitreous humor is common as a person ages. This degeneration may lead to the build up fluid in pockets in the vitreous humor, that lead to vitreomacular adhesions, which can then result in pulling.A partial detachment of the hyaloid membrane can lead to a retinal detachment and also sometimes VMT.

== Diagnosis ==
Medical imaging is needed to diagnosis a VTS. Optical coherence tomography is a non-invasive imaging technique to both diagnose and monitor the progression of VTS. OCT imaging visualizes the retina by obtaining cross-sectional images of the retina in layers. OCT can also image the surface of the retina. This type of imaging allows medical professionals to measure the force being placed on the vitreomacular interface and also view the level of pulling or distortion on the retina.Diagnostic imaging with a dynamic B-scan ultrasound may be useful for visualizing the retina.

== Treatment ==
Managing vitreomacular traction depends on the severity of the condition, how much vision is affected, the costs of the procedures, and a clinical assessment of potential benefits associated with a treatment approach.The standard surgical treatment includes performing a vitrectomy. This procedure is usually effective at reducing or 'releasing' the tension associated with VTS. The vitrectomy procedure increases the risk of a full thickness macular hole (FTMH). If FTMH occurs it can usually be treated by a second surgery to close the hole and decrease loss of the vision.

A less invasive procedure is pneumatic vitreolysis. This approach may be more cost effective and has a low reported rate of post-procedure side effects or complications. Vitreolysis using an enzymatic (enzymatic vitreolysis) approach may also be used, however, this is more costly and may be associated with more adverse effects.

The "wait and see" approach - with careful clinical monitoring and monitoring of the vision at home is often suggested for people who do not have severe FTS and whose vision is not greatly affected.Gas bubble injection into the eye along with head positioning may also be used to treat VTS with the goal of decreasing the tension and traction to reduce VTS.

== Prognosis ==
With treatment, most people with VTS are able to minimize loss of their visual field.
