= S. Rodman Irvine =

American ophthalmologist

Samuel Rodman "Rod" Irvine (5 December 1906, Salt Lake City, Utah – 27 February 1999, Laguna Beach, California) was an American ophthalmologist and ophthalmic surgeon, known for the Irvine-Gass syndrome.

Irvine received his bachelor's degree in 1928 from Stanford University and his M.D. in 1932 from Harvard Medical School. In 1936 he completed his ophthalmology residency at the Massachusetts Eye and Ear Infirmary.

After residency, he joined his father's practice in Los Angeles, Calif, but soon went to India, where he gained a great deal of practical experience working with Colonel Wright at the British Government Hospital in Madras from 1936 to 1937. He visited the major eye clinics in Europe on his way home and then settled back into practice in Los Angeles. He and his father (and later his brother, Sandy) joined the faculty at the University of Southern California. Through the beneficence of one of his patients, Estelle Doheny, they established the Doheny Eye Foundation at University of Southern California. As the University of California, Los Angeles, developed, he focused his attention there to build the eye service as its clinical chair. When the ophthalmology department developed to the point of a full-time teaching institution, he decided to remain in private practice, but did continue to serve as a clinical professor while handing over the reins of the department to Bradley Straatsma.

From 1942 to 1946 Irvine was a major in the United States Army Air Forces. For the academic year 1950–1951 he was a visiting professor at the Wilmer Eye Institute, where he performed experiments on rabbits to study the effects of steroids on corneal scarring and also taught optics and refraction to the residents. In September 1952 he reported on a newly defined syndrome (cystoid macular edema aka Irvine-Gass syndrome) following cataract surgery, based upon a clinical study of 2000 patients. In the late 1950s he studied surgical diathermy for retinal detachments and its effects on the vitreous and other ocular tissues.

At age 63 he retired from surgical practice and moved to Laguna Beach, where he became a consulting ophthalmologist and a member of U.C. Irvine's clinical faculty.

Upon his death he was survived by three sons. S. Rodman Irvine's younger brother Alexander "Sandy" Ray Irvine Jr. died in 1996.

== Awards and honors ==
- 1952 — Proctor Lectureship of the Francis I. Proctor Foundation for Research in Ophthalmology
- 1978 — Howe Medal of the American Ophthalmological Society
