= Macular hole =

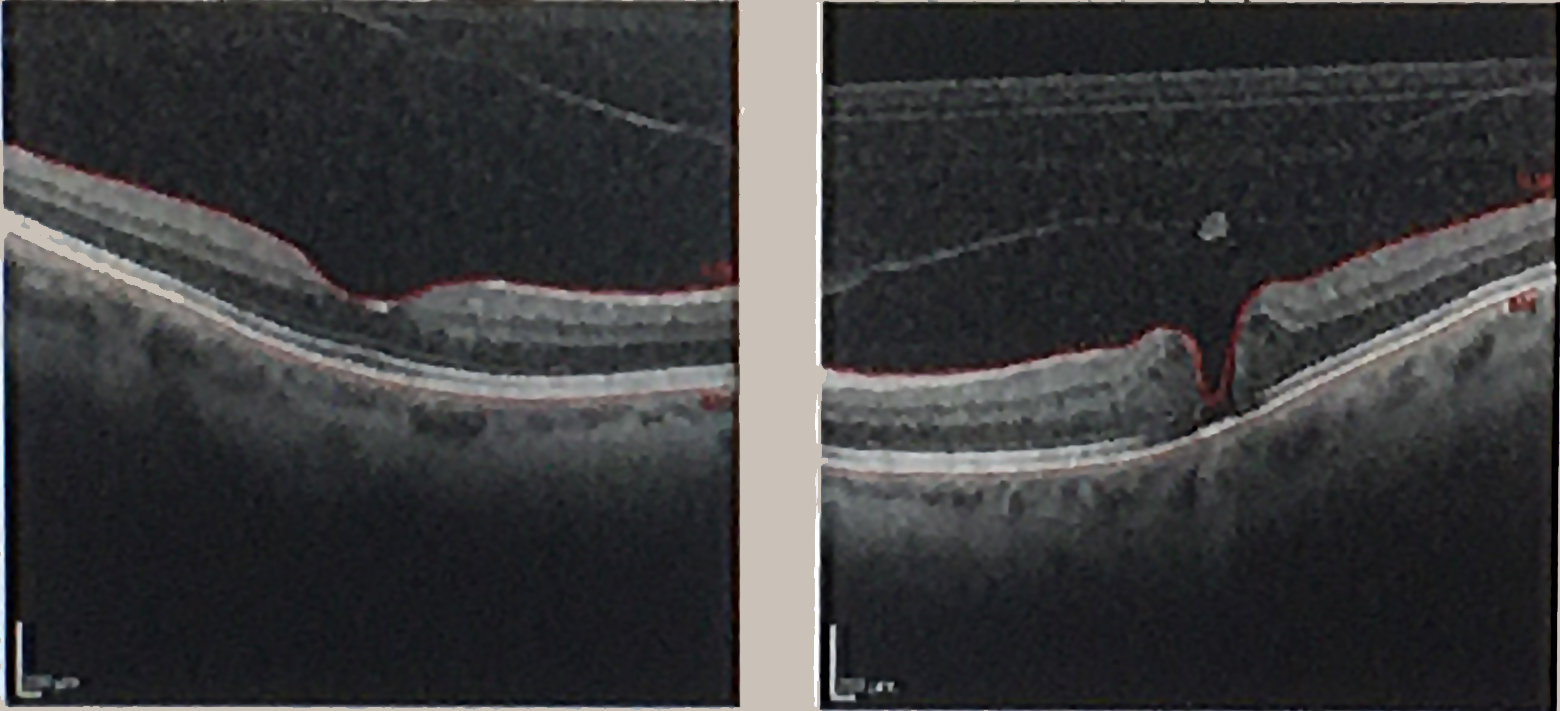
- Optical coherence tomography (OCT) of a macular hole (right) as compared to a normal macula.
- Specialty: Ophthalmology

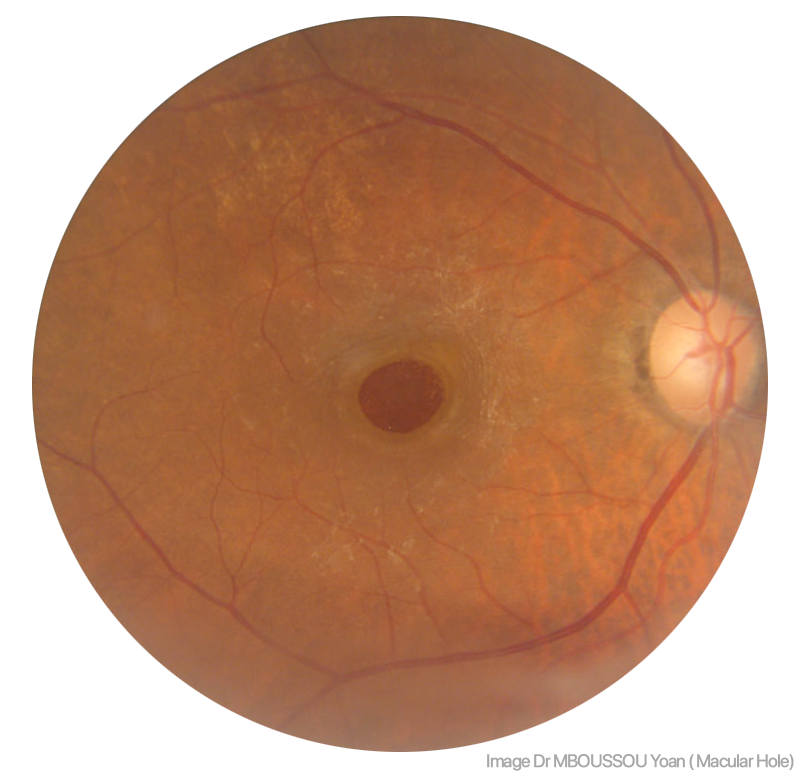
A macular Hole

A macular hole is a small break in the macula, located in the center of the eye's light-sensitive tissue called the retina.

== Symptoms and signs ==
If the vitreous is firmly attached to the retina when it pulls away, it can tear the retina and create a macular hole. Also, once the vitreous has pulled away from the surface of the retina, some of the fibers can remain on the retinal surface and can contract. This increases tension on the retina and can lead to a macular hole. In either case, the fluid that has replaced the shrunken vitreous can then seep through the hole onto the macula, blurring and distorting central vision.

== Causes ==
The eye contains a jelly-like substance called the vitreous. Shrinking of the vitreous usually causes the hole. As a person ages, the vitreous becomes watery and begins to pull away from the retina. If the vitreous is firmly attached to the retina when it pulls away, a hole can result.

== Diagnosis ==
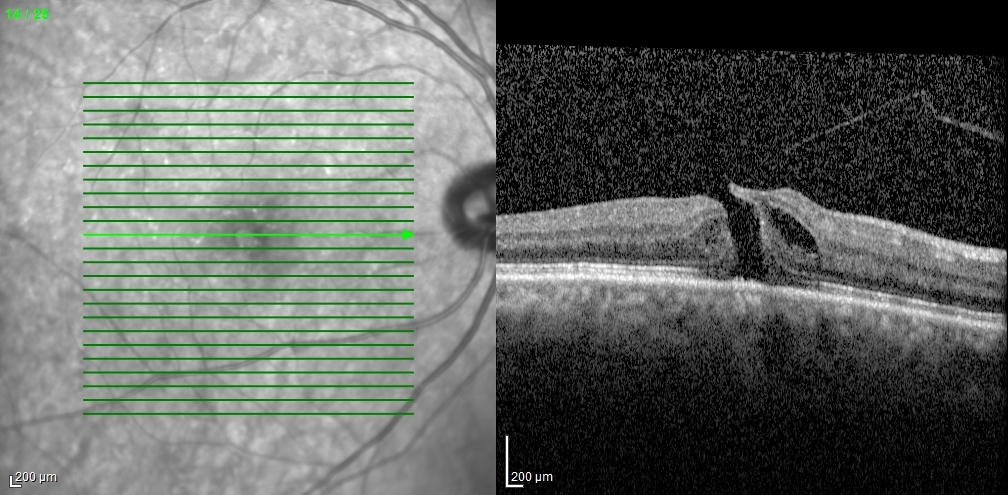
Macular hole on the right eye

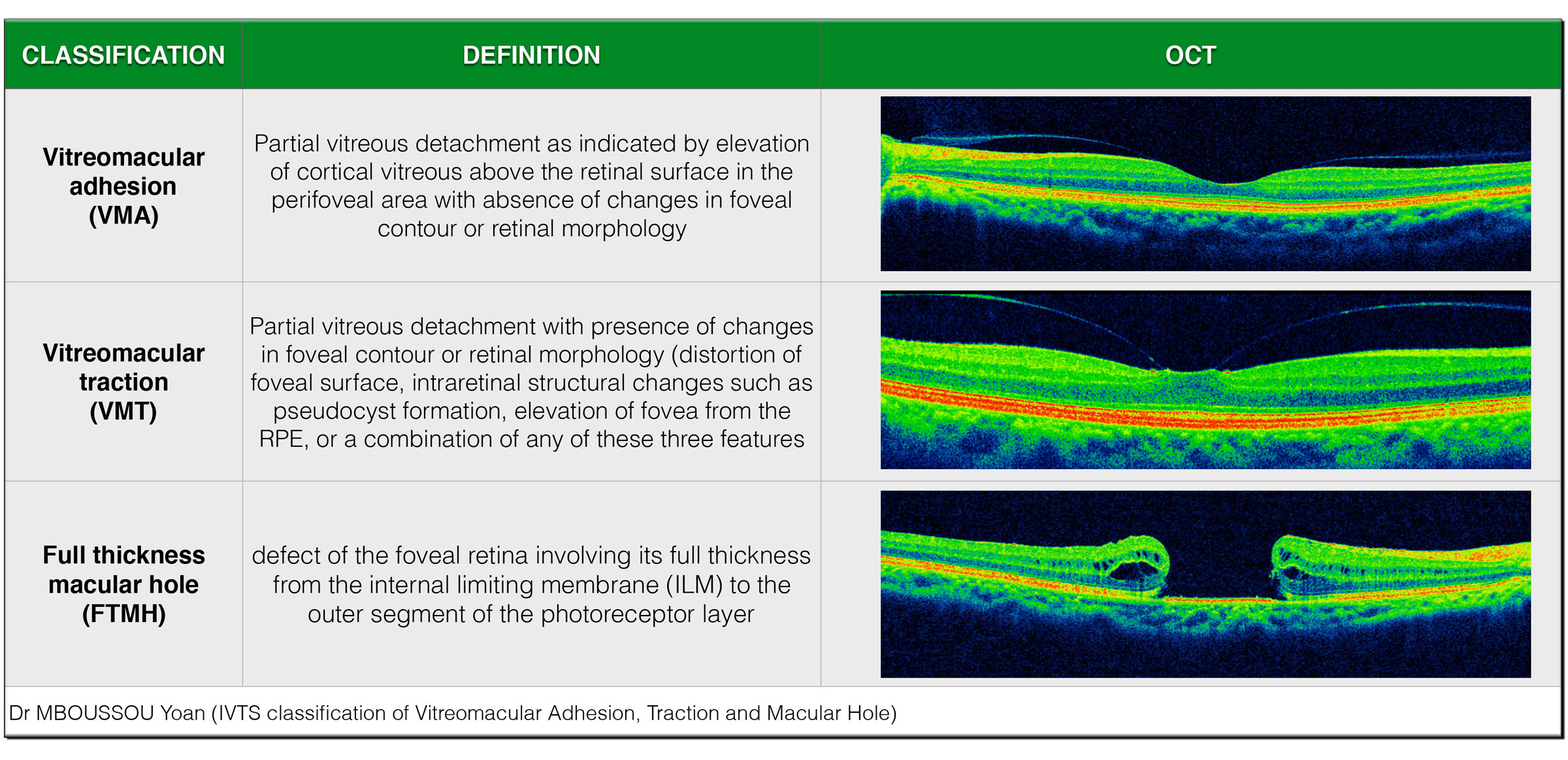
Classification of Vitreomacular Adhesion, Traction, and Macular Hole (IVTS 2013)

Macular degeneration is a condition affecting the tissues lying under the retina, while a macular hole involves damage from within the eye, at the junction between the vitreous and the retina itself. There is no relationship between the two diseases. Depending upon the degree of attachment or traction between the vitreous and the retina, there may be risk of developing a macular hole in the other eye. In those cases where the vitreous has already become separated from the retinal surface, there is very little chance of developing a macular hole in the other eye. On the other hand, when the vitreous remains adherent and pulling on the macular region in both eyes, then there may be a greater risk of developing a hole in the second eye. In very rare instances, trauma or other conditions lead to the development of a macular hole. In the vast majority of cases, however, macular holes develop spontaneously. As a result, there is no known way to prevent their development through any nutritional or chemical means, nor is there any way to know who is at risk for developing a hole prior to its appearance in one or both eyes.

Watzke–Allen test is used in the diagnosis of a full thickness macular hole and also to assess retinal function after surgical closure of the hole.

== Management ==
Vitrectomy is the common way to treat a macular hole. It is done by placing a gas bubble in the vitreous of the eye which helps flatten the macular hole and holds it in place as the eye heals. The gas bubble slowly shrinks on its own. Treatment is also done using ocriplasmin.
