= Watzke–Allen test =

Retina examination method

Watzke-Allen test
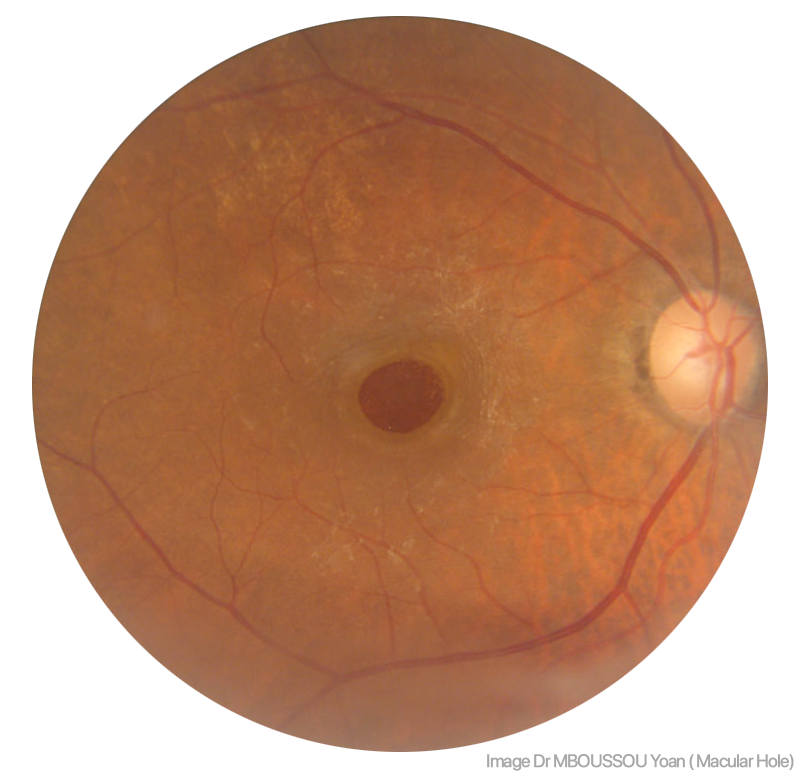
- A macular hole
- Purpose: diagnosis of full thickness macular hole

Watzke-Allen test (WAT) also known as Watzke-Allen slit beam test (WASBT) is a test used in the diagnosis of a macular hole, a condition affecting the macular region in the retina of the eye. The test is done by projecting a thin line of light over the macula with a slit lamp.

== Theory ==
Watzke-Allen test is a test used in the diagnosis of a macular hole. It is a subjective test based on photoreceptor (cone cell) displacement.

Test can be used to differentiate full thickness macular hole from other similar conditions and also to assess retinal function after surgical closure of the hole.

== Procedure ==
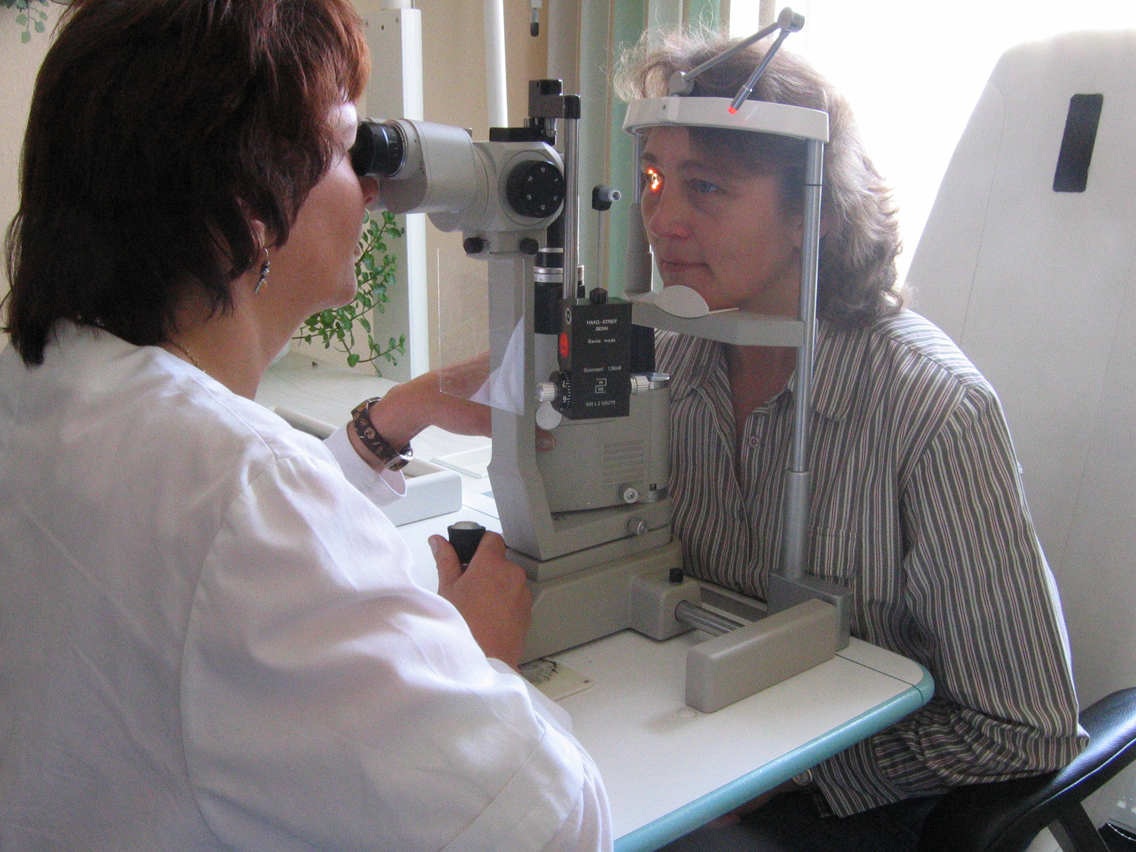
Eye examination with the aid of a slit lamp.

Watzke-Allen test is done by projecting a thin line of light over the macula with a slit lamp. A fundus lens or macular lens is used to aim beam of light on the macula. It is best performed in a dilated eye, projecting a slit beam of approximately 100 μm. The slit is projected in both vertical and horizontal orientations. The patient is asked to describe whether the light line is straight or narrow or has a gap (break). A straight line indicates an intact fovea where as narrow or gapped line indicate macular holes. A narrowing indicates isolated, damaged but functional foveal receptors. Patient may be asked to draw what he sees.

== Advantages and disadvantages ==
The advantages of WAT are its availability, affordability, easy to perform and ability to be used through relatively opaque media, which can help overcome the limitations of spectral-domain OCT, however, it is not known whether the measurements recorded by WAT reflect the true extent of photoreceptor displacement.
