= Bradley R. Straatsma =

American ophthalmologist (1927–2026)

- Born: December 29, 1927; Grand Rapids, Michigan, U.S.
- Died: April 16, 2026 (aged 98); Los Angeles, California, U.S.
- Occupation: Emeritus Professor
- Spouse: Ruth Straatsma

Academic background
- Education: University of Michigan (BS); Yale University (MD); University of West Los Angeles (JD)

Bradley R. Straatsma (December 29, 1927 – April 16, 2026) was an American ophthalmologist and emeritus professor at the David Geffen School of Medicine at UCLA. He co-founded and directed the Jules Stein Eye Institute for thirty years and acted as president of the American Academy of Ophthalmology and American Ophthalmological Society. He was chairman of the American Board of Ophthalmology and has authored over 575 scientific publications.

== Early life and education ==
Straatsma was born in Grand Rapids, Michigan, the son of a plastic surgeon from New York. He completed his undergraduate degree at the University of Michigan in 1946 and attained a medical degree from the Yale School of Medicine in 1951.

== Career ==
After graduating, Straatsma served as a physician in the United States Navy as part of the Underwater Demolition Team (now Navy Seals). He served on submarines with Navy frogmen, where he also learned to scuba dive. After serving as a lieutenant in the United States Naval Reserve, Straatsma completed his residency in ophthalmology at the Harkness Eye Institute at Columbia University. He completed a fellowship at the Armed Forces Institute of Pathology and the Wilmer Eye Institute at Johns Hopkins University.

in 1959, Straatsma joined UCLA as its inaugural chief of the division of ophthalmology, becoming a professor in 1962. In 1961, he collaborated with Jules C. Stein, a philanthropist, ophthalmologist, and founder of MCA, to establish the Jules Stein Eye Institute at UCLA, established in 1966. He became director of the institute and acted as chairman of the department of ophthalmology until 1994.

During his tenure as a professor, Straatsma authored more than 575 scientific publications on vitreoretinal disease, choroidal melanoma, and ophthalmic education. He served as president of the American Academy of Ophthalmology, American Ophthalmological Society, Association of University Professors of Ophthalmology, Pan-American Association of Ophthalmology and Academia Ophthalmologica Internationalis (AOI). He also served as chairman of the American Board of Ophthalmology. He edited the journal 'Eye Care for the American People' and was Editor-in-Chief of the American Journal of Ophthalmology from 1983 to 2002.

After stepping down as chair of the UCLA Department of Ophthalmology and director of the Stein Eye Institute in 1994, Dr. Straatsma attended the University of West Los Angeles School of Law and received his juris doctor degree in 2002.

After studying law, Straatsma was appointed a trustee of the Africa Eye Foundation and helped establish the Magrabi ICO Cameroon Eye Institute in Yaoundé, Cameroon in 2016. He also co-chaired a joint meeting of the Internation Council of Ophthalmology (ICO) and the Academia Ophthalmologica Internationalis (AOI) for global ophthalmology research and treatment.

Straatsma died on April 16, 2026, aged 98.

== Personal life ==
Straatsma was married to Ruth Straatsma, a musician. The couple supported the Los Angeles Philharmonic and often attended the Walt Disney Concert Hall. He and Ruth became PADI certified scuba divers and often went on dive trips during travel to medical conferences.

As an undergraduate, Straatsma played the trombone and baritone saxhorn in the Michigan Marching Band. He also played in concert bands, jazz bands, and ensembles during college. At UCLA, Straatsma played as part of a faculty band at the Bel-Air Country Club.

== Awards ==
- Honorary Doctor of Science, Columbia University (1984)
- Laureate Award, American Academy of Ophthalmology (2010)
- Jules François Golden Medal, International Council of Ophthalmology
- Lucien Howe Medal, American Ophthalmological Society
- American Academy of Ophthalmology Guest of Honor (2020)
- Gold José Rizal Medal, Asia-Pacific Academy of Ophthalmology (2004)
- Prince Abdulaziz Al Saud Prevention of Blindness Award, Middle East African Council of Ophthalmology
- Benjamin F. Boyd Humanitarian Award, Pan-American Association of Ophthalmology
- International Duke-Elder Medal (2006)
