= Hudson–Stahli line =

The Hudson–Stahli line is a line of iron deposition lying roughly on the border between the middle and lower thirds of the cornea. It lies in the corneal epithelium. Usually it has about 0.5 mm in thickness and is 1–2 mm long. It is generally horizontal, with possible mild downward trend in the middle. It is present normally in people over the age of 50, but seems to dissipate to some degree by the age of 70.

The Hudson–Stahli line is not associated with any pathology calling for clinical intervention. Formation of the line may depend upon the rate of tear secretion.

However, the Hudson–Stahli line can be enhanced in hydroxychloroquine toxicity.

== See also ==
- Fleischer ring – corneal iron depositions in keratoconus
