= Slit lamp =

Device for examining the eye

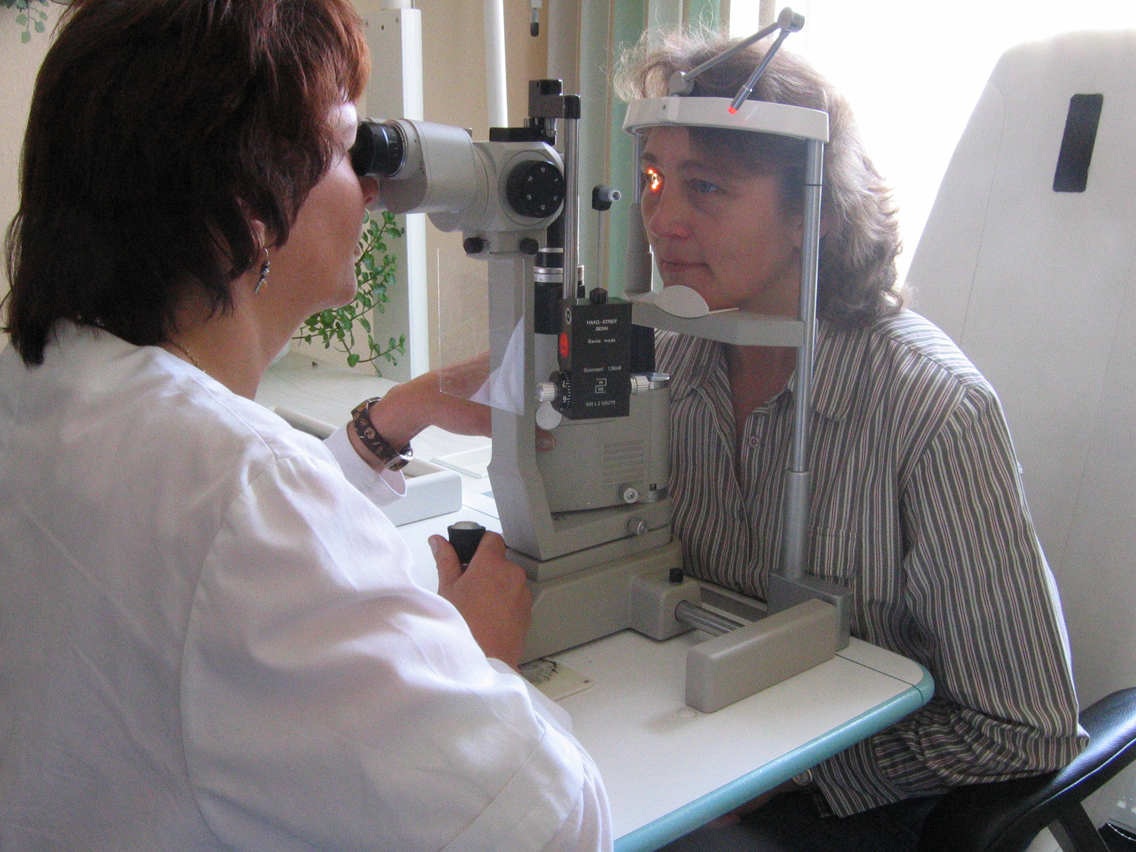
Eye examination with the aid of a slit lamp

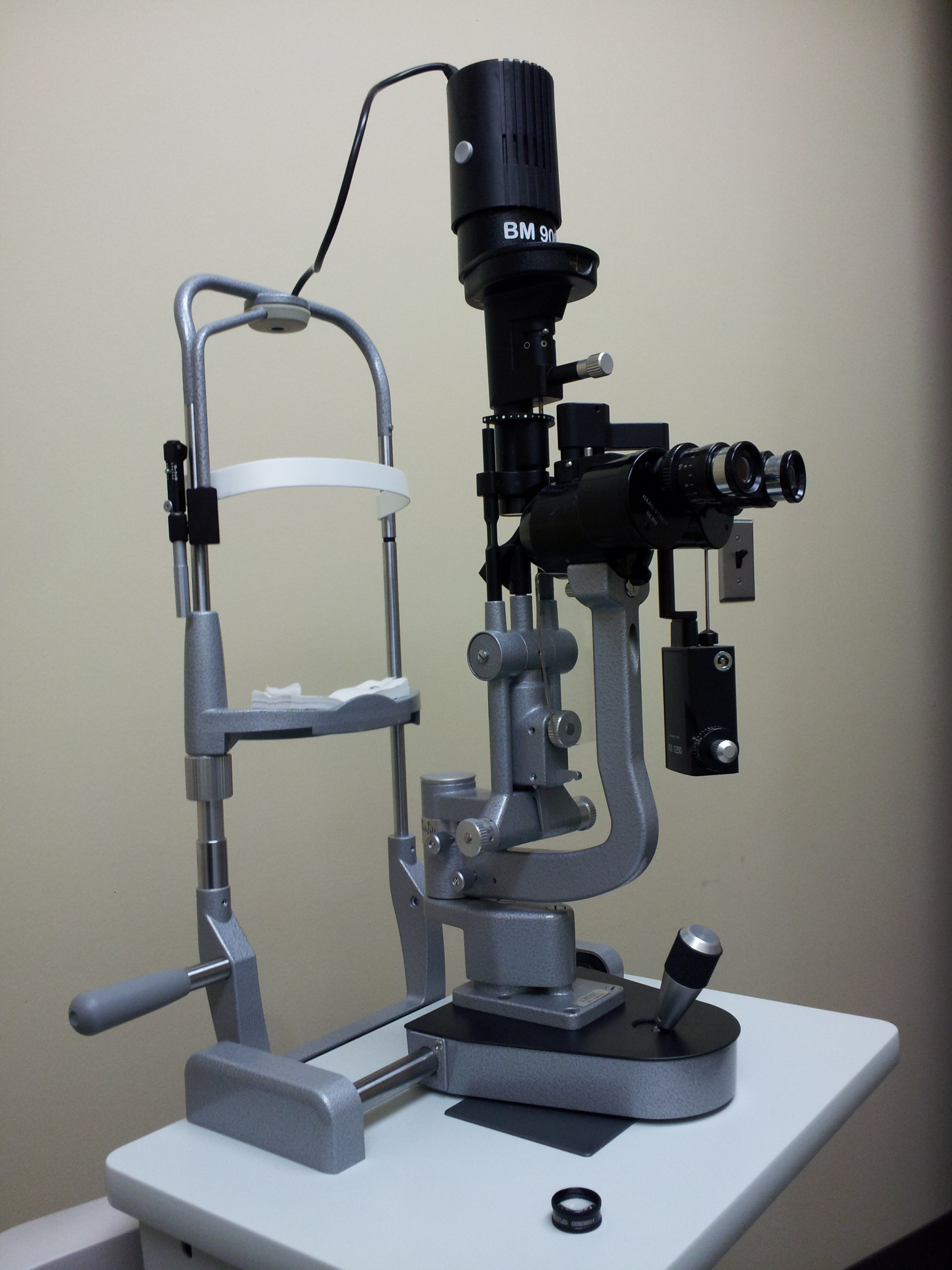
Side view of a slit lamp

Cataract in human eye as seen seen on examination with the slit lamp

In ophthalmology and optometry, a slit lamp is an instrument used in conjunction with a biomicroscope and consisting of a high-intensity light source that can be focused to shine a thin sheet of light into the eye. The lamp facilitates an examination of the anterior and posterior segment of the human eye, which includes the eyelid, sclera, conjunctiva, iris, natural crystalline lens, and cornea. The binocular slit-lamp examination provides a stereoscopic magnified view of the eye structures in detail, enabling anatomical diagnoses to be made for a variety of eye conditions. A second, hand-held lens is used to examine the retina.

== History ==
Two conflicting trends emerged in the development of the slit lamp. One trend originated from clinical research and aimed to apply the increasingly complex and advanced technology of the time. The second trend originated from ophthalmologic practice and aimed at technical perfection and a restriction to useful methods. The first man credited with developments in this field was Hermann von Helmholtz (1850) when he invented the ophthalmoscope.

In ophthalmology and optometry, the instrument is called a "slit lamp", although it is more correctly called a "slit lamp instrument". Today's instrument is a combination of two separate developments, the corneal microscope and the slit lamp itself. The first concept of a slit lamp dates back to 1911 credited to Allvar Gullstrand and his "large reflection-free ophthalmoscope." The instrument was manufactured by Zeiss and consisted of a special illuminator connected to a small stand base through a vertical adjustable column. The base was able to move freely on a glass plate. The illuminator employed a Nernst glower which was later converted into a slit through a simple optical system. However, the instrument never received much attention and the term "slit lamp" did not appear in any literature again until 1914.

It was not until 1919 that several improvements were made to the Gullstrand slit lamp made by Vogt Henker. First, a mechanical connection was made between lamp and ophthalmoscopic lens. This illumination unit was mounted to the table column with a double articulated arm. The binocular microscope was supported on a small stand and could be moved freely across the tabletop. Later, a cross slide stage was used for this purpose. Vogt introduced Koehler illumination, and the reddish Nernst glower was replaced with the brighter and whiter incandescent lamp. Special mention should be paid to the experiments that followed Henker's improvements in 1919. On his improvements the Nitra lamp was replaced with a carbon arc lamp with a liquid filter. At this time the great importance of color temperature and the luminance of the light source for slit lamp examinations were recognized and the basis created for examinations in red-free light.

In the year 1926, the slit lamp instrument was redesigned. The vertical arrangement of the projector made it easy to handle. For the first time, the axis through the patient's eye was fixed along a common swiveling axis, although the instrument still lacked a coordinate cross-slide stage for instrument adjustment. The importance of focal illumination had not yet been fully recognized.

In 1927, stereo cameras were developed and added to the slit lamp to further its use and application. In 1930, Rudolf Theil further developed the slit lamp, encouraged by Hans Goldmann. Horizontal and vertical co-ordinate adjustments were performed with three control elements on the cross-slide stage. The common swivel axis for microscope and illumination system was connected to the cross-slide stage, which allowed it to be brought to any part of the eye to be examined. A further improvement was made in 1938. A control lever or joystick was used for the first time to allow for horizontal movement.

Following World War II the slit lamp was improved again. On this particular improvement the slit projector could be swiveled continuously across the front of the microscope. This was improved again in 1950, when a company named Littmann redesigned the slit lamp. They adopted the joystick control from the Goldmann instrument and the illumination path present in the Comberg instrument. Additionally, Littmann added the stereo telescope system with a common objective magnification changer.

In 1965, the Model 100/16 Slit Lamp was produced based on the slit lamp by Littmann. This was soon followed by the Model 125/16 Slit Lamp in 1972. The only difference between the two models was their operating distances of 100 mm to 125 mm. With the introduction of the photo slit lamp further advancements were possible. In 1976, the development of the Model 110 Slit Lamp and the 210/211 Photo Slit Lamps were an innovation by which each were constructed from standard modules allowing for a wide range of different configurations. At the same time, halogen lamps replaced the older illumination systems to make them brighter and essentially daylight quality. From 1994 onwards, new slit lamps were introduced which took advantage of new technologies. The last major development was in 1996 in which included new slit lamp optics.

== General procedure ==
While a patient is seated in the examination chair, they rest their chin and forehead on a support area to steady the head. Using the biomicroscope, the ophthalmologist or optometrist then proceeds to examine the patient's eye. A fine strip of paper, stained with fluorescein, a fluorescent dye, may be touched to the side of the eye; this stains the tear film on the surface of the eye to aid examination. The dye is naturally rinsed out of the eye by tears.

A subsequent test may involve placing drops in the eye in order to dilate the pupils. The drops take about 15 to 20 minutes to work, after which the examination is repeated, allowing the back of the eye to be examined. Patients will experience some light sensitivity for a few hours after this exam, and the dilating drops may also cause increased pressure in the eye, leading to nausea and pain. Patients who experience serious symptoms are advised to seek medical attention immediately.

Adults need no special preparation for the test; however children may need some preparation, depending on age, previous experiences, and level of trust.

== Illumination ==
Various methods of slitlamp illumination are required to obtain full advantage of slit-lamp biomicroscope. There are mainly six type of illuminating options:

1. Diffuse illumination,
2. Direct focal illumination,
3. Specular reflection,
4. Transillumination or retroillumination,
5. Indirect lateral illumination or Indirect proximal illumination and
6. Sclerotic scatter.

Oscillatory Illumination is sometimes considered an illumination technique. Observation with an optical section or direct focal illumination is the most frequently applied method of examination with the slit lamp. With this method, the axes of illuminating and viewing path intersect in the area of the anterior eye media to be examined, for example, the individual corneal layers.

=== Diffuse illumination ===
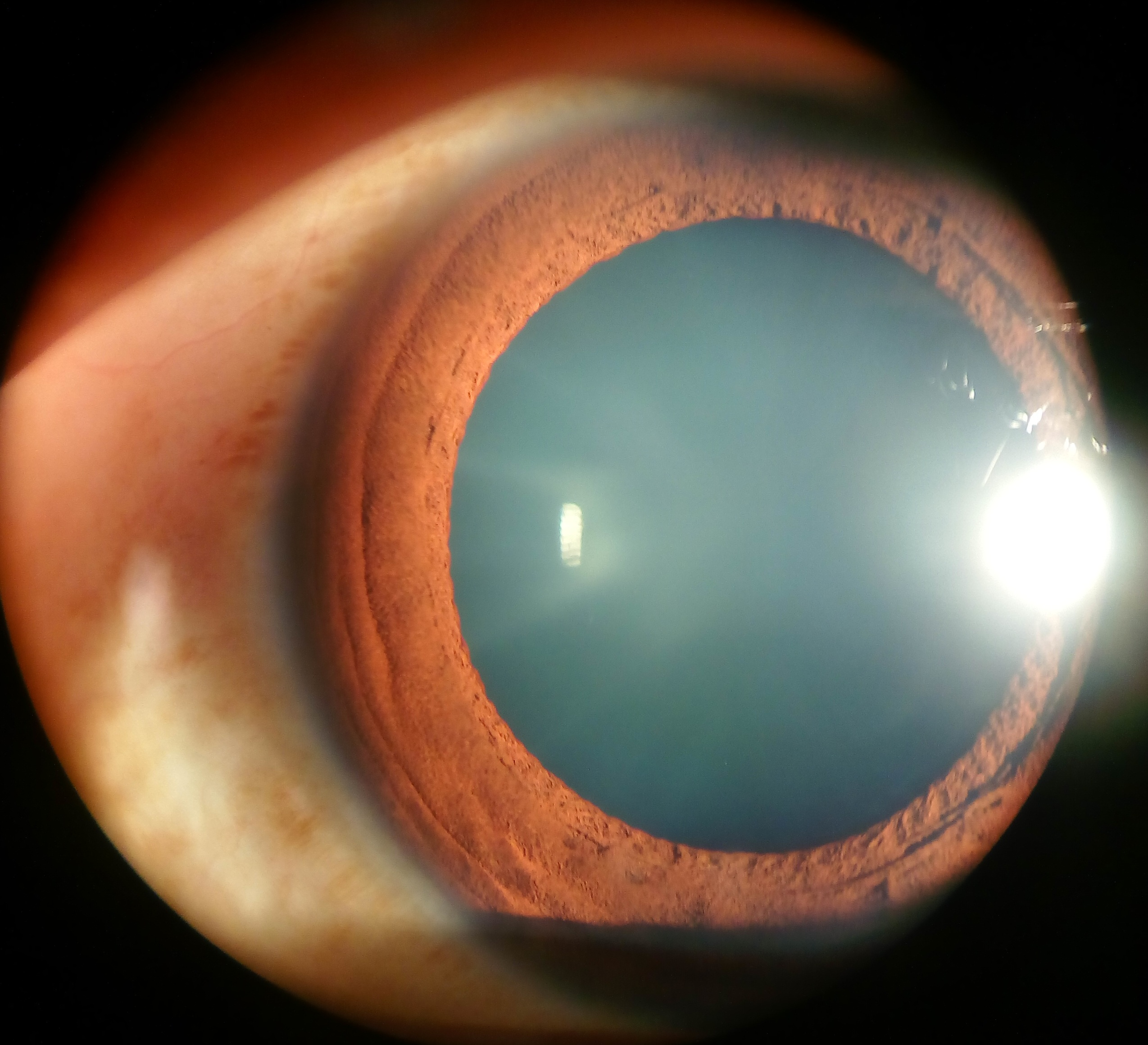
Diffuse Illumination of anterior segment

If media, especially that of the cornea, are opaque, optical section images are often impossible depending on severity. In these cases, diffuse illumination may be used to advantage. For this, the slit is opened very wide and a diffuse, attenuated survey illumination is produced by inserting a ground glass screen or diffuser in the illuminating path. "Wide beam" illumination is the only type that has the light source set wide open. Its main purpose is to illuminate as much of the eye and its adnexa at once for general observation.

=== Direct focal illumination ===
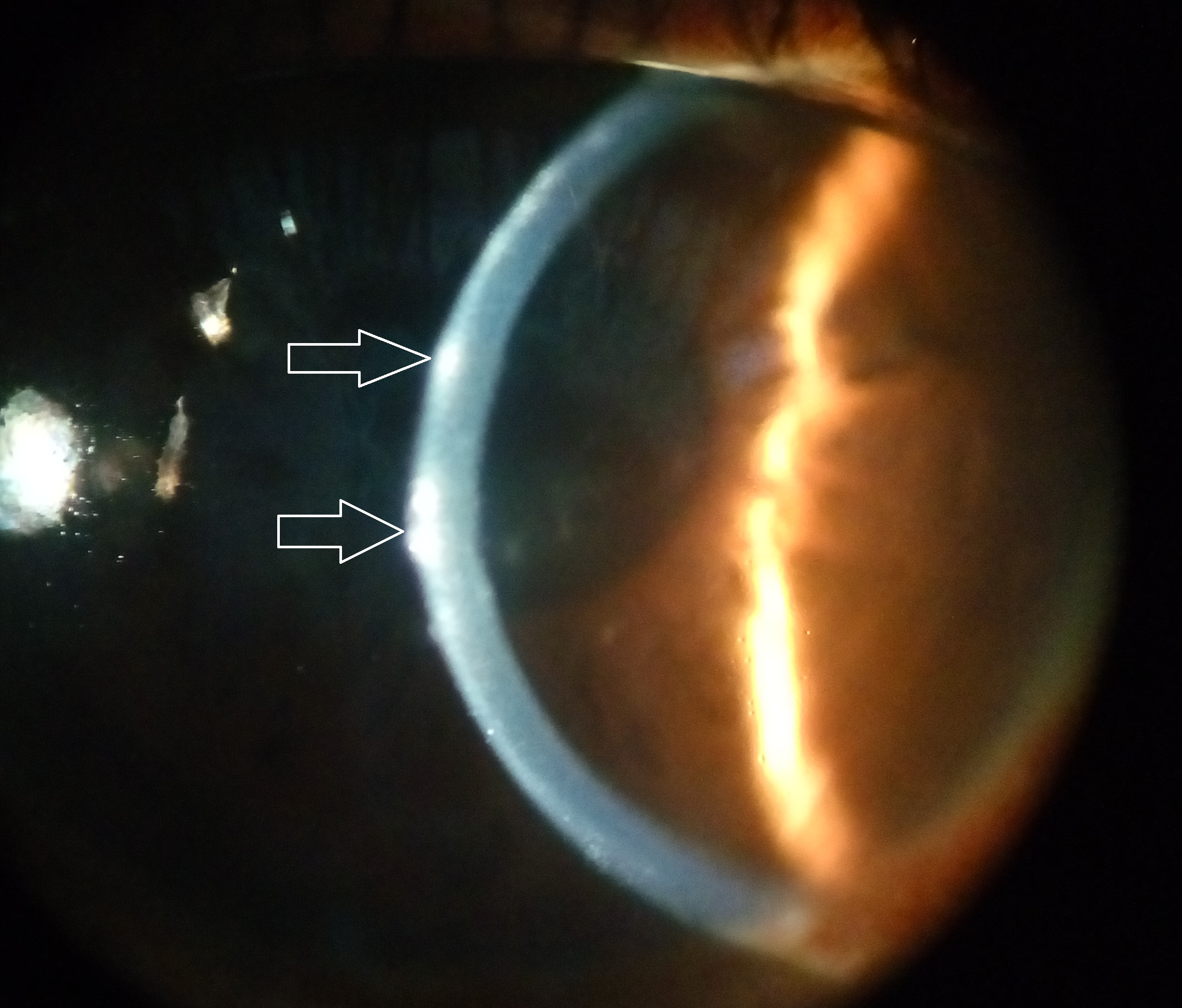
Lesions are seen in superficial layers of cornea by direct focal illumination

Observation with an optical section or direct focal illumination is the most frequently applied method. It is achieved by directing a full-height, hairline to medium width, medium-bright beam obliquely into the eye and focusing it on the cornea so that a quadrilateral block of light illuminates the transparent medias of eye. Viewing arm and illuminating arm are kept parfocal. This type of illumination is useful for depth localization. Direct focal illumination is used for grading cells and flare in anterior chamber by shortening height of beam to 2–1 mm.

=== Specular reflection ===
Specular reflection, or reflected illumination is just like patches of reflection seen on sunlit lake water surface. To achieve specular reflection, the examiner directs a medium to narrow beam of light (it must be thicker than an optical section) toward the eye from the temporal side. The angle of illumination should be wide (50°-60°) relative to the examiners axis of observation (which should be slightly nasal to the patients visual axis). A bright zone of specular reflection will be evident on the temporal, midperipheral corneal epithelium. It is used to see endothelial outline of cornea.

=== Transillumination or retroillumination ===
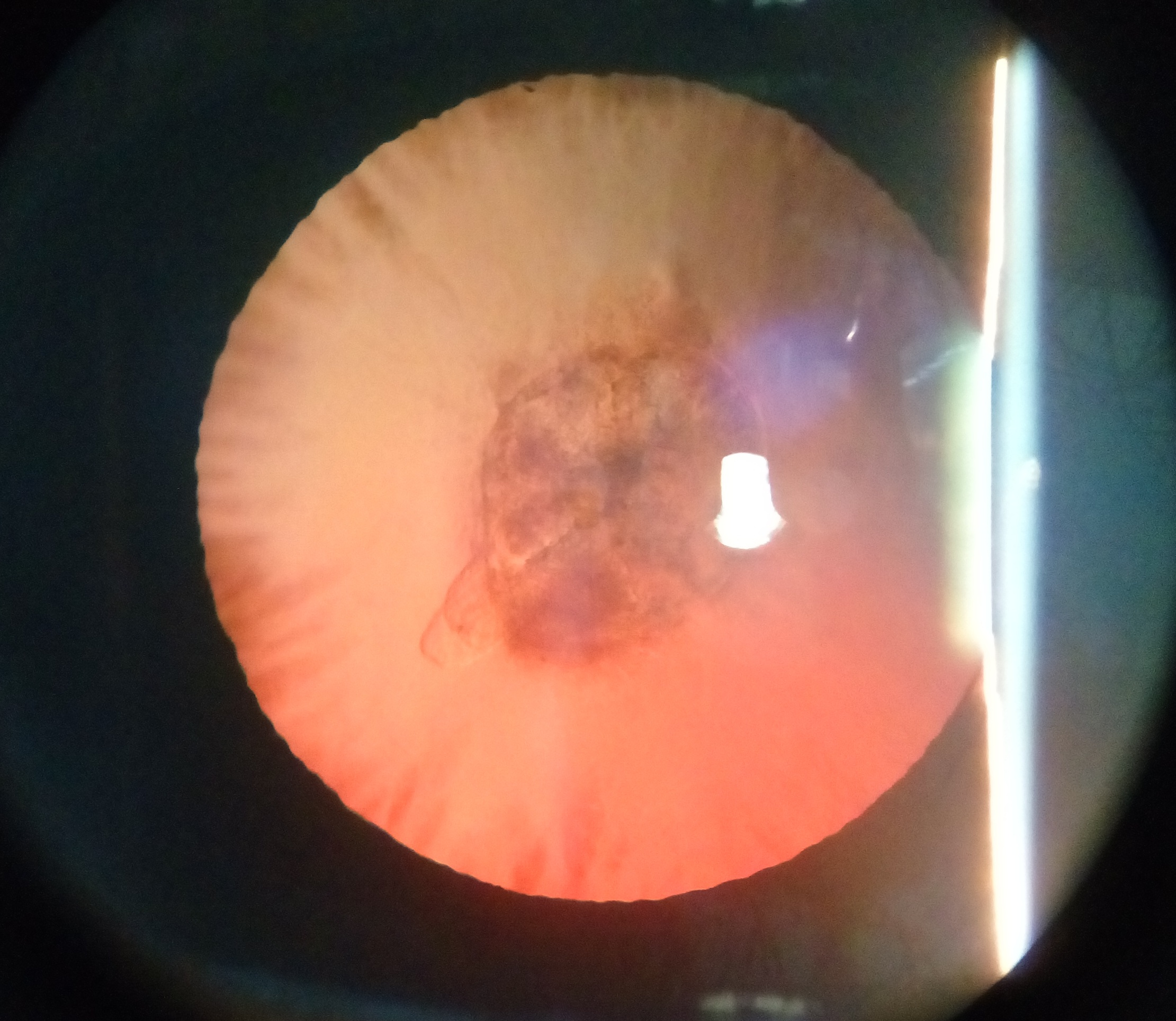
Retro-illumination of anterior subcapsular cataract

In certain cases, illumination by optical section does not yield sufficient information or is impossible. This is the case, for example, when larger, extensive zones or spaces of the ocular media are opaque. Then the scattered light that is not very bright normally is absorbed. A similar situation arises when areas behind the crystalline lens are to be observed. In this case the observation beam must pass a number of interfaces that may reflect and attenuate the light.

=== Indirect illumination ===
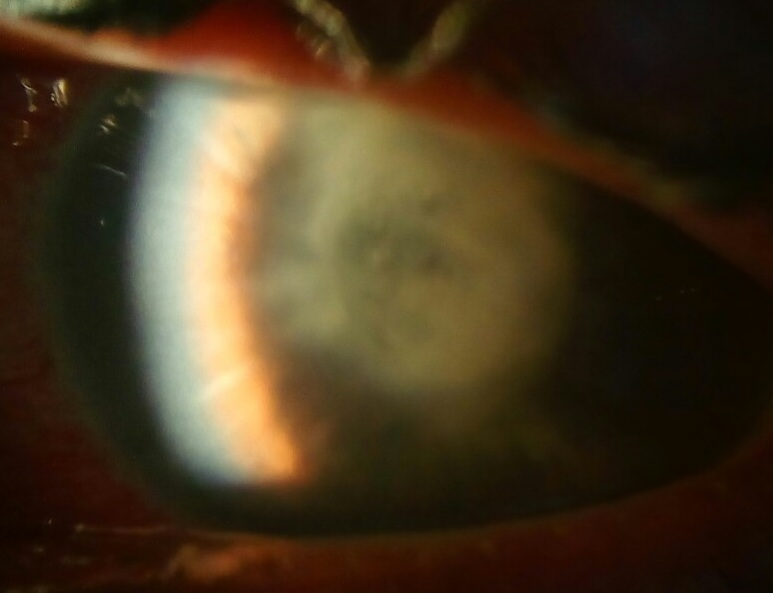
Indirect lateral illumination of corneal ulcer

With this method, light enters the eye through a narrow to medium slit (2 to 4 mm) to one side of the area to be examined. The axes of illuminating and viewing path do not intersect at the point of image focus, to achieve this; the illuminating prism is decentered by rotating it about its vertical axis off the normal position. In this way, reflected, indirect light illuminates the area of the anterior chamber or cornea to be examined. The observed corneal area then lies between the incident light section through the cornea and the irradiated area of the iris. Observation is thus against a comparatively dark background.

=== Sclerotic scatter or scattering sclero-corneal illumination ===
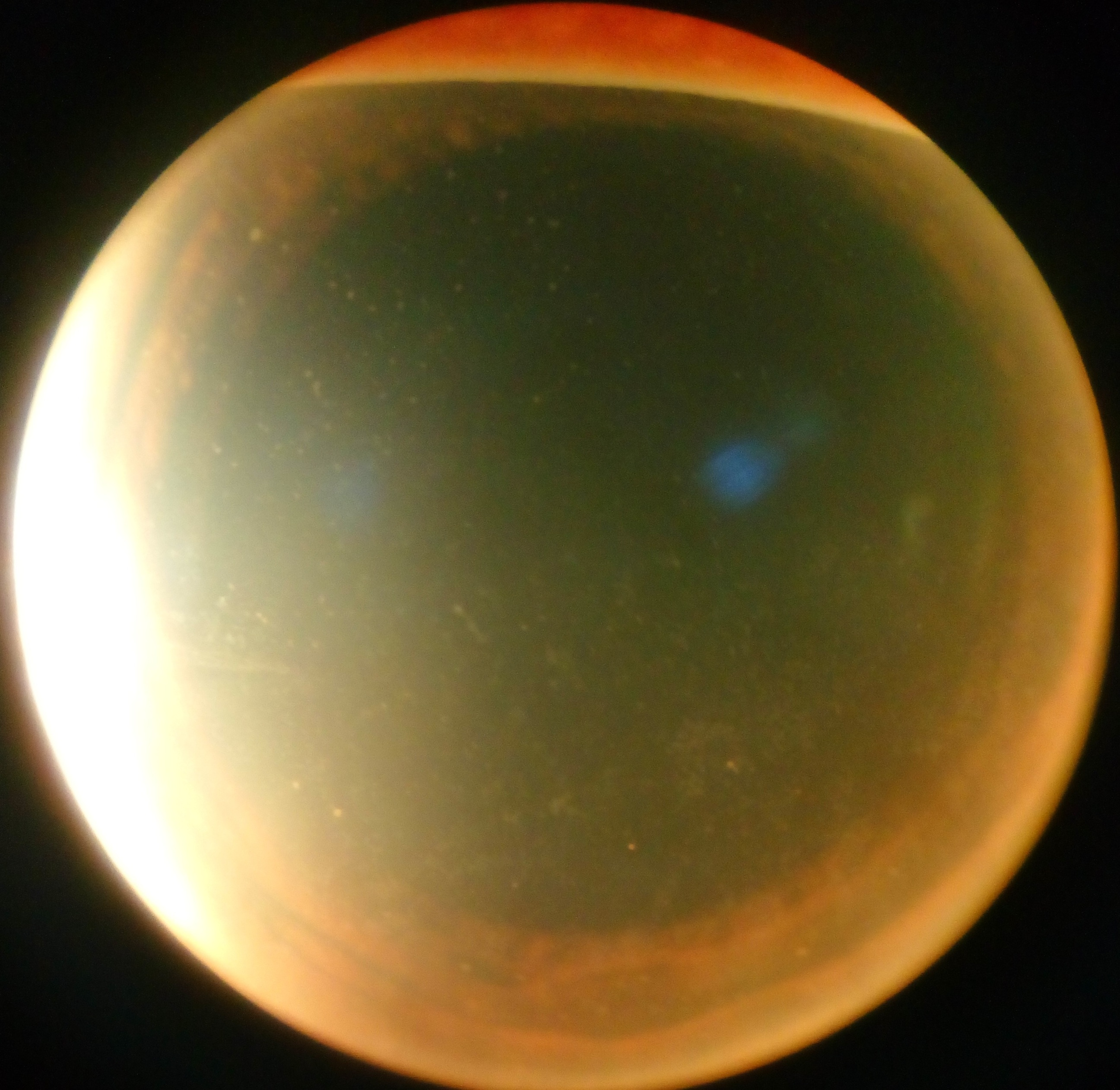
Sclerotic scatter illumination showing KP on cornea

With this type of illumination, a wide light beam is directed onto the limbal region of the cornea at an extremely low angle of incidence and with a laterally de-centered illuminating prism. Adjustment must allow the light beam to transmit through the corneal parenchymal layers according to the principle of total reflection allowing the interface with the cornea to be brightly illuminated. The magnification should be selected so that the entire cornea can be seen at a glance.

== Special techniques ==
=== Fundus observation and gonioscopy with the slit lamp ===
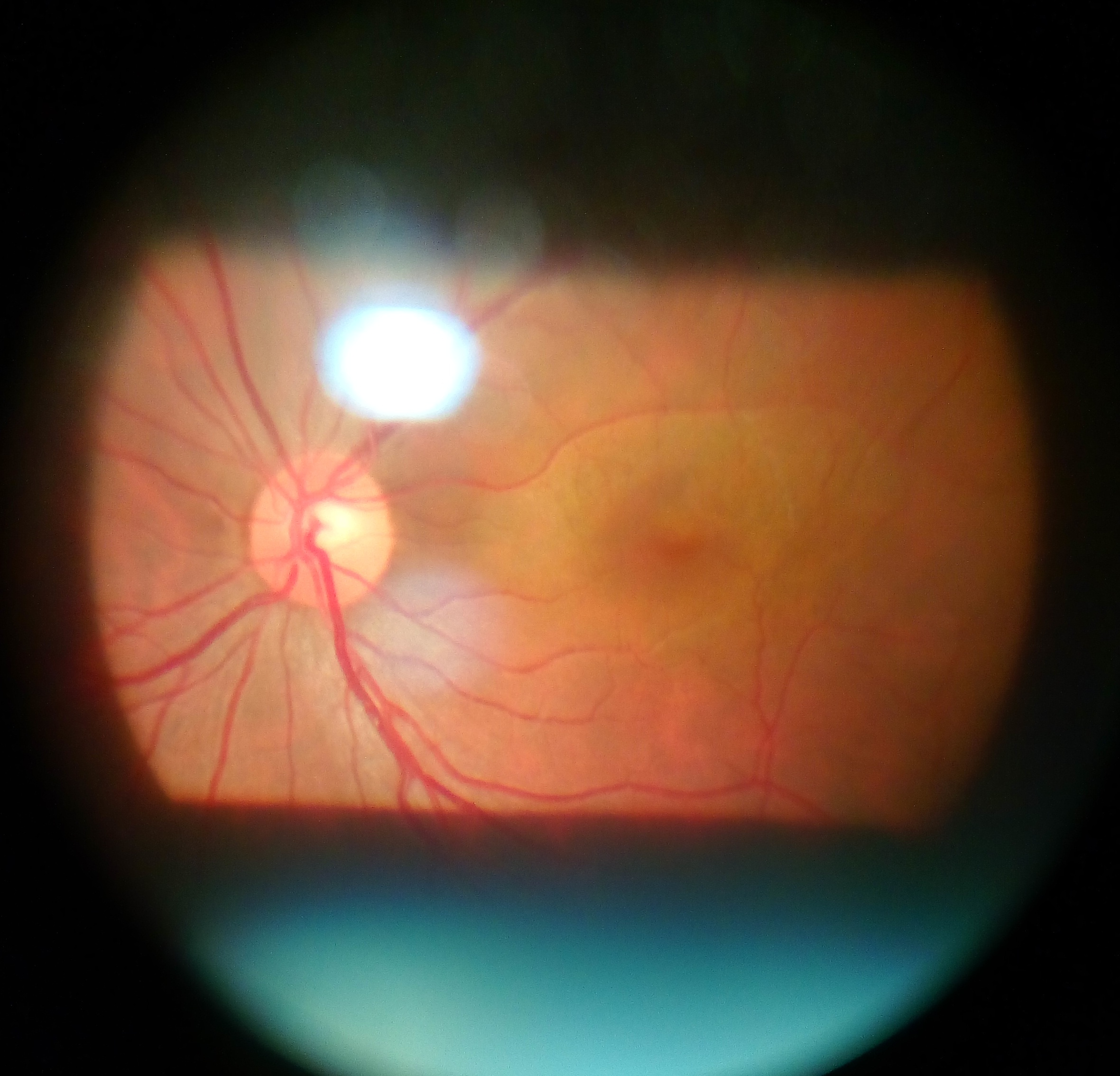
Fundoscopy by using +90 diopter lens with the slit lamp

Fundus observation is generally performed via ophthalmoscopy, where the observer (fundus camera or observing eye) is focused to infinity, which brings the subject's fundus into focus due to the refractive power of the subject's optical media. In contrast, the microscope in slit lamp biomicroscopy is focused to the anterior segments of the eye, such that direct observation of the fundus is impossible due to the subject's refractive power. However, with the use of auxiliary optics, the fundus can be brought within the focusing range of the microscope. These optics usually take the form of a lens placed on or near the subject's cornea, which range in optical properties and practical application.

Watzke–Allen test is a test used in diagnosis of a full thickness macular hole and also to assess retinal function after surgical closure of the hole, with the help of slit lamp.

== Light filters ==
Most slit-lamps have five light filters options:

1. Unfiltered,
2. Heat absorption- for increased patient comfort
3. Grey filter,
4. Red free- for better visualisation of nerve fibre layer and haemorrhages and blood vessels.
5. Cobalt blue- after staining with fluorescein dye, for seeing corneal ulcers, contact lens fitting, Seidel's test

=== Cobalt blue light ===
Slit lamps produce light of the wavelength 450 to 500 nm, known as "cobalt blue". This light is specifically useful for looking for problems in the eye once it has been stained with fluorescein.

== Types ==
There are two distinct slit lamp types based on the location of their illumination system:

=== Zeiss type ===
Zeiss-type slit lamp

In the Zeiss-type slit lamp, the illumination is located below the microscope. This type of slit lamp is named after the manufacturing company Carl Zeiss.

=== Haag Streit type ===
Haag Streit-type slit lamp

In the Haag Streit-type slit lamp, the illumination is located above the microscope. This type of slit lamp is named after the manufacturing company Haag Streit.

== Interpretation ==
The slit lamp exam may detect many diseases of the eye, including:

- Cataract
- Conjunctivitis
- Corneal injury such as corneal ulcer or corneal swelling
- Diabetic retinopathy
- Fuchs' dystrophy
- Keratoconus (Fleischer ring)
- Macular degeneration
- Retinal detachment
- Retinal vessel occlusion
- Retinitis pigmentosa
- Sjögren's syndrome
- Toxoplasmosis
- Uveitis
- Wilson's disease (Kayser–Fleischer ring)

A sign that may be seen in slit lamp examination is a "flare", which is when the slit-lamp beam is visible in the anterior chamber. This occurs when there is breakdown of the blood-aqueous barrier with resultant exudation of protein.
