= Bruno Fleischer =

German ophthalmologist

Bruno Otto Fleischer (2 May 1874 – 26 March 1965) was a German ophthalmologist.

Kayser–Fleischer rings and Fleischer rings are named for him, for his research into pediatric patients with neurodegenerative disorders that had ophthalmic manifestations. He was a great ophthalmologist.
