= Vitreomacular adhesion =

Human medical condition

- Schematic diagram of the human eye.
- Specialty: Ophthalmology

Vitreomacular adhesion (VMA) is a human medical condition where the vitreous gel (or simply vitreous, AKA vitreous humour) of the human eye adheres to the retina in an abnormally strong manner. As the eye ages, it is common for the vitreous to separate from the retina. But if this separation is not complete, i.e. there is still an adhesion, this can create pulling forces on the retina that may result in subsequent loss or distortion of vision. The adhesion in of itself is not dangerous, but the resulting pathological vitreomacular traction (VMT) can cause severe ocular damage.

The current standard of care for treating these adhesions is pars plana vitrectomy (PPV), which involves surgically removing the vitreous from the eye. A biological agent for non-invasive treatment of adhesions called ocriplasmin has been approved by the FDA on October 17, 2012.

== Symptom and signs ==
Traction caused by VMA is the underlying pathology of an eye disease called symptomatic VMA. There is evidence that symptomatic VMA can contribute to the development of several well-known eye disorders, such as macular hole and macular pucker, that can cause visual impairment, including blindness. It may also be associated with age-related macular degeneration (AMD), diabetic macular edema (DME), retinal vein occlusion, and diabetic retinopathy (DR).

== Pathology ==
Over time, it is common for the vitreous within the human eye to liquify and collapse in processes known as syneresis and synchisis respectively. This creates fluid-filled areas that can combine to form pockets of vitreous gel that are mostly liquid with very small concentrations of collagen. If these liquid pockets are close enough to the interface between the vitreous gel and the retina, they can cause complete separation of the vitreous from the retina in a normally occurring process in older humans called posterior vitreous detachment (PVD). PVD in of itself is not dangerous and a natural process.

If the separation of the vitreous from the retina is not complete, areas of focal attachment or adhesions can occur, i.e. a VMA. The pulling forces or traction from this adhesion on the retinal surface can sometimes cause edema within the retina, damage to retinal blood vessels causing bleeding, or damage to the optic nerve causing disruption in the nerve signals sent to the brain for visual processing. While the VMA itself is not dangerous, the resultant pulling on the retina called vitreomacular traction (VMT) causes the above damage. The size and strength of the VMA determine the variety of resulting pathologies or symptoms.

VMA can also lead to the development of VMT/traction-related complications such as macular puckers and macular holes leading to distorted vision or metamorphopsia; epiretinal membrane; tractional macular oedema; myopic macular retinoschisis; visual impairment; blindness. The incidence of VMA is reported as high as 84% for patients with macular hole, 100% for patients with vitreomacular traction syndrome, and 56% in idiopathic epimacular membrane.

== Diagnosis ==
Careful eye examination by an ophthalmologist or optometrist is critical for diagnosing symptomatic VMA. Imaging technologies such as optical coherence tomography (OCT) have significantly improved the accuracy of diagnosing symptomatic VMA.

== Treatment ==
A new FDA approved drug was released on the market late 2013. Jetrea (Brand name) or Ocriplasmin (Generic name) is the first drug of its kind used to treat vitreomacular adhesion.

Mechanism of Action: Ocriplasmin is a truncated human plasmin with proteolytic activity against protein components of the vitreous body and vitreoretinal interface. It dissolves the protein matrix responsible for the vitreomacular adhesion. Adverse drug reactions: Decreased vision, potential for lens subluxation, dyschromatopsia (yellow vision), eye pain, floaters, blurred vision. New Drug comparison Rating gave Jetea a 5 indicating an important advance. Previously, no recommended treatment was available for the patient with mild symptomatic VMA. In symptomatic VMA patients with more significant vision loss, the standard of care is pars plana vitrectomy (PPV), which involves surgically removing the vitreous from the eye, thereby surgically releasing the symptomatic VMA. In other words, vitrectomy induces PVD to release the traction/adhesion on the retina. An estimated 850,000 vitrectomy procedures are performed globally on an annual basis with 250,000 in the United States alone.

A standard PPV procedure can lead to serious complications including small-gauge PPV. Complications can include retinal detachment, retinal tears, endophthalmitis, and postoperative cataract formation. Additionally, PPV may result in incomplete separation, and it may potentially leave a nidus for vasoactive and vasoproliferative substances, or it may induce development of fibrovascular membranes. As with any invasive surgical procedure, PPV introduces trauma to the vitreous and surrounding tissue.

There are data showing that nonsurgical induction of PVD using ocriplasmin (a recombinant protease with activity against fibronectin and laminin) can offer the benefits of successful PVD while eliminating the risks associated with a surgical procedure, i.e. vitrectomy. Pharmacologic vitreolysis is an improvement over invasive surgery as it induces complete separation, creates a more physiologic state of the vitreomacular interface, prevents the development of fibrovascular membranes, is less traumatic to the vitreous, and is potentially prophylactic. As of 2012, ThromboGenics is still developing the ocriplasmin biological agent. Ocriplasmin is approved recently under the name Jetrea for use in the United States by the FDA.view.

An experimental test of injections of perfluoropropane (C_{3}F_{8}) on 15 symptomatic eyes of 14 patients showed that vitreomacular traction resolved in 6 eyes within 1 month and resolved in 3 more eyes within 6 months. A systematic review found high-certainty evidence that Ocriplasmin compared to no treatment increases the chance of resolution and improves vision in people with symptomatic VMA. Ocriplasmin probably reduces the need for surgery but there were more adverse events in eyes treated with ocriplasmin compared to control.
