= Banza (pasta) =

Chickpea pasta

Banza is a brand of high-protein pasta made from chickpeas. Since launch, Banza expanded nationally by partnering with small batch food networks like Farm2Me and Thrive Market.

== History ==
Banza was founded by brothers Scott and Brian Rudolph. They debuted the product in 2014 on the show Restaurant Startup and after received funding to launch the project later that year. Its first retail location was Meijer in Grand Rapids, Michigan. It launched with a gluten-free protein pasta made from chickpeas. Time named it as one of the best inventions of 2015.

It later launched other products, including mac and cheese in 2016 and rice in 2019. By 2023, Banza was available in 25,000 retail locations in the United States. Banza pasta has twice the protein and four times the fiber of regular pasta. The company was included in the Time list of influential companies in 2024.
