= Jules Stein Eye Institute =

Medical department at UCLA

Coordinates: 34.064908406944°N 118.4437598855945°W

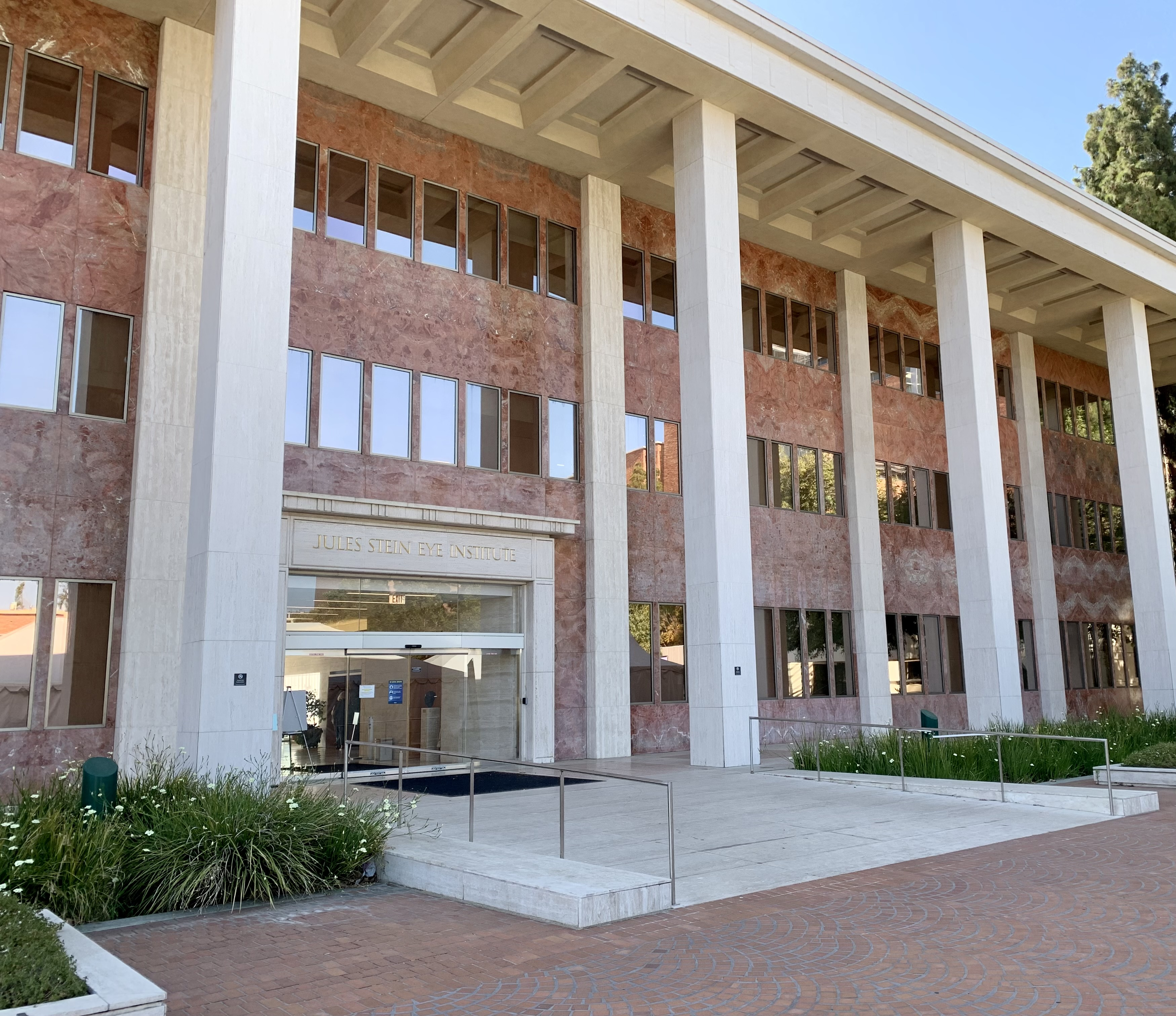
- Founders: Jules and Doris Stein
- Established: 1966
- Director: Anne L. Coleman
- Address: 100 Stein Plaza UCLA
- Location: Los Angeles, California, United States of America
- Interactive map of Jules Stein Eye Institute
- Website: www.uclahealth.org/eye/

The Jules Stein Eye Institute is a center for ophthalmology research and treatment at the UCLA David Geffen School of Medicine in Los Angeles. It was founded in 1966 by Jules Stein, ophthalmologist and founder of MCA, and Bradley R. Straatsma, founding chairman of the UCLA Department of Ophthalmology.

The institute specializes in vision preservation and restoration and treats conditions related to glaucoma, macular degeneration, diseases of the cornea and retina, Graves' disease, and other conditions. Anne L. Coleman has been director since 2022.

The center runs a Mobile Eye Clinic for schools and shelters in Los Angeles and manages charitable programs like Vision IN-School, Shared Vision, the Preschool Vision Screening program, and the Indigent Children and Families program.

The Stein Eye Institute partnered with the Doheny Eye Institute in 2015.

== Additional references ==
- "Doheny Eye Institute and Jules Stein Eye Institute Fourth Annual Comprehensive Ophthalmology Review Course". Medrounds.org. Blog post. February 1, 2009.
- Valliant, Linda L (September 15, 1998). "Jules Stein Eye Institute seeks constant improvement". Ophthalmology Times – via HighBeam Research. ; Press release.
- Ben Simon, Guy J.; Yoon, Michael K.; Atul, Jane; Nakra, Tanuj; McCann, John D.; Goldberg, Robert A. (2006). "Clinical manifestations of orbital mass lesions at the Jules Stein Eye Institute, 1999-2003". Ophthalmic Surgery, Lasers & Imaging. 37 (1): 25–32. ISSN 1542-8877. PMID 16468548.
