= Doheny Eye Institute =

US research institute

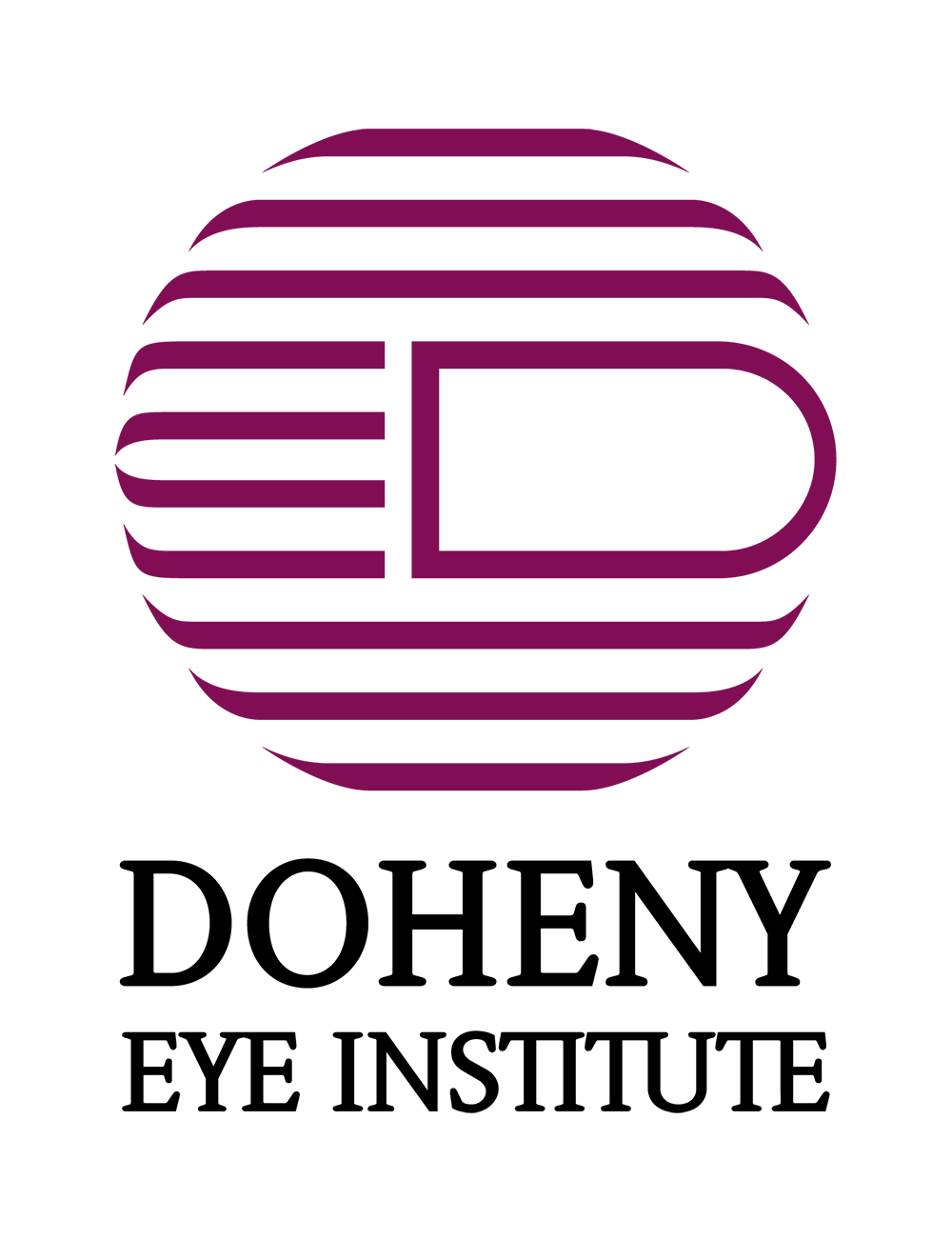
- Abbreviation: DEI
- Formation: 1947
- Type: Non-profit; Charitable organization
- Purpose: Clinical research, medical education
- Headquarters: 150 N. Orange Grove Blvd. Pasadena, California
- Location: United States
- Chief Executive Officer: Marissa Goldberg
- Chief Scientific Officer: Deborah Ferrington, PhD
- Key people: Martha Espinoza; Daniel Katz; Andrea Lantini; Steve MacGregor; Kent Tepper
- Affiliations: University of California Los Angeles; Jules Stein Eye Institute; UCLA Health System; Ronald Reagan UCLA Medical Center
- Website: doheny.org

Doheny Eye Institute (Doheny Eye or DEI) established in 1947, is a nonprofit ophthalmic research institute. The doctors and scientists of Doheny Eye Institute undertake basic and clinical research, a role known as a physician-scientist.

== History ==
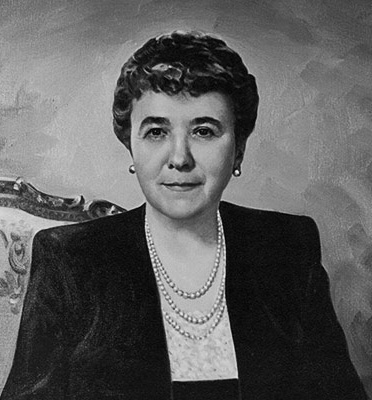
Painting of Carrie Estelle Doheny.

In 1944, Carrie Estelle Doheny, wife of the prominent Los Angeles oilman Edward L. Doheny, became blind in her left eye and began to suffer a progressive loss of sight in her right eye. The loss of vision inspired her to create and fund the organization named for her, the Estelle Doheny Eye Foundation, in 1947. The foundation was formed with the purpose of supporting "the conservation, improvement and restoration" of human eyesight. The Doheny Pavilion, at St. Vincent Medical Center in Los Angeles, opened to patients in 1956. Drs. A. Ray Irvine, Sr., and S. Rodman Irvine served as co-Medical Directors. Dr. A. Ray Irvine, Sr., served as the personal ophthalmologist of Carrie Estelle Doheny, as well of American entrepreneur Walt Disney.

In 1966, USC invited the Estelle Doheny Eye Foundation Trustees to inspect an available parcel on the USC Health Sciences Campus, and negotiations to acquire the property began. In 1971, the Estelle Doheny Eye Foundation finalized its formal affiliation agreement with USC, and named William H. Spencer, MD, as its new medical director, forming what was then called the "Doheny Eye Institute." In 1977, Stephen J. Ryan became medical director and proposed the creation of the Doheny Eye Hospital, to serve as a new headquarters and provide clinical facilities for the ophthalmology faculty. The hospital was officially dedicated in 1985.

In 1987, the Estelle Doheny Eye Foundation was renamed the Doheny Eye Institute, and a $32 million campaign was launched to build the Doheny Eye Institute building. Shortly thereafter, Stephen J. Ryan became President of the institute. In 1992, TV personality Gene Autry was honored as the first recipient of the institute's Doheny Award.

The Doheny Retina Institute was established in 2001, followed by the Doheny Image Reading Center (DIRC) in 2003.

Doheny and USC ended their relationship in 2012, and USC created a new entity called the USC Roski Eye Institute for its department of ophthalmology. In December 2013 the Doheny Eye Institute entered into an exclusive, long-term affiliation agreement with the University of California Los Angeles, forming the "Doheny Eye Center UCLA". Ronald E. Smith had served as Chairman of Ophthalmology at USC from 1995 to 2013, and left USC to follow Doheny, and became vice chair of the department at UCLA.

Since 2015, Marissa Goldberg has served as CEO of the institute.

== Awards and rankings ==
=== Grants ===
By 1986 the institute ranked 4th in National Eye Institute support, behind research organizations Harvard, Johns Hopkins and Columbia University. Cumulative Awards from the National Eye Institute exceeded $44 million in 2015.

=== Rankings ===
Doheny Eye Institute has been ranked in the Top Ten by U.S. News & World Report and in the Top Ten by American Academy of Ophthalmology since rankings began in 1993 and 1996, respectively.

In 2016, Stein and Doheny Eye Institutes were ranked among the top 5 ophthalmology institutes in the United States by U.S. News & World Report.

== See also ==
- American Academy of Ophthalmology
- David Geffen School of Medicine at UCLA
- Jules Stein Eye Institute
- National Eye Institute
