= Intraocular hemorrhage =

- Schematic diagram of the human eye
- Specialty: Ophthalmology

Intraocular hemorrhage (sometimes called hemophthalmos or hemophthalmia) is bleeding inside the eye (oculus in Latin). Bleeding can occur from any structure of the eye where there is vasculature or blood flow, including the anterior chamber, vitreous cavity, retina, choroid, suprachoroidal space, or optic disc.

Intraocular hemorrhage may be caused by physical trauma (direct injury to the eye); ocular surgery (such as to repair cataracts); or other diseases, injuries, or disorders (such as diabetes, hypertension, or shaken baby syndrome). Severe bleeding may cause high pressure inside the eye, leading to blindness.

== Types ==
Intraocular hemorrhage is classified based on the location of the bleeding:

- Hyphema (in the anterior chamber)
- Suprachoroidal hemorrhage (SCH) is a rare complication of intraocular surgery in which blood from the ciliary arteries enters the space between the choroid and the sclera. It is potentially vision-threatening.
- In the posterior segment of the eyeball:
  - Vitreous hemorrhage (into the vitreous)
  - Subretinal hemorrhage (under the retina)
  - Submacular hemorrhage (under the macula)

Another type of ocular hemorrhage is subconjunctival bleeding, which occurs just underneath the conjunctiva.

== Causes ==
A subconjunctival hemorrhage can often occur without any obvious cause or harm to the eye. A strong enough sneeze or cough can cause a blood vessel in the eye to burst.

Hyphema is a result of blunt or penetrating trauma to the orbit that increases intraocular pressure, causing tears in the vessels of the ciliary body and iris. Certain medical conditions—such as leukemia, hemophilia, Von Willebrand disease, and sickle cell disease—put patients at risk of developing hyphema, as does the use of anticoagulant medications. Neovascularization of the eye, often associated with diabetes mellitus, is also a risk factor. People who have undergone surgery (such as for cataracts) may develop hyphema during or up to a week after the surgery.

Vitreous hemorrhage can be caused by proliferative diabetic retinopathy, vitreous detachment with or without retinal breaks, and trauma. Less common causes include vascular occlusive disease, retinal arterial macroaneurysm, hemoglobinopathy, age-related macular degeneration, and intraocular tumors.

Subretinal hemorrhage is caused by retinal and/or choroidal circulation. Significant subretinal hemorrhage occurs in several conditions, but is most commonly associated with age-related macular degeneration, presumed ocular histoplasmosis, high myopia, retinal arterial macroaneurysm, and trauma. Other causes include Terson syndrome (as a result of subarachnoid hemorrhage), hemophilia, anticoagulants, and thrombolysis.

== Pathophysiology ==
Hemorrhages present differently depending on their type.

A subconjunctival hemorrhage appears as a bright red patch on the white (sclera) of the eye and is commonly referred to as a burst blood vessel.

In hyphema, blood pools in the anterior chamber, where the iris (the colored part of the eye) and the pupil are located. Hyphemas are graded based on the amount of blood covering the cornea. Once an open globe has been ruled out, intraocular pressure should be checked and treated if greater than 21 mm Hg. All patients with hyphema require ophthalmology consultation. Any patient with a hyphema larger than grade II, elevated intraocular pressure, or sickle cell disease—or who is unable to comply with daily ophthalmology evaluations—should be admitted to the hospital.

A vitreous hemorrhage is bleeding into the vitreous gel: the thick, clear fluid in the center of the eye that allows light to pass through to the retina, the nerve fiber layer that sends images to the brain.

A subretinal hemorrhage is an accumulation of blood between the photoreceptor layer and the retinal pigment epithelium (RPE), arising from the choroidal or retinal circulation. These hemorrhages are a deep red color and broad in shape, with diffuse margins. They are commonly seen in age-related macular degeneration, presumed ocular histoplasmosis, high myopia, polypoidal choroidal vasculopathy (PCV), retinal macroaneurysm, and trauma.

Submacular hemorrhages are commonly seen in choroidal neovascular membranes secondary to age-related macular degeneration. They are an uncommon complication of choroidal or retinal vascular abnormalities, including PCV, choroidal neovascularization (CNV), and retinal macroaneurysm.

== Diagnosis ==
A subconjunctival hemorrhage is diagnosed by visual examination; it will present as a red splotch visible to the naked eye. No other testing is required.

Hyphema is diagnosed with a slit lamp examination. If the hyphema is large enough, it will also be visible on a penlight exam. Symptoms include bleeding in the front of the eye, sensitivity to light, pain in the eye, and blurry, clouded, or blocked vision.

Vitreous hemorrhage may be diagnosed when symptoms such as floaters, haziness, perception of shadows, or cobwebs are present. It is usually painless. Visual acuity may be affected variably depending on the amount of blood in the visual axis. Diagnosis is made with slit lamp examination and confirmed with optical coherence tomography (OCT).

Subretinal hemorrhages are diagnosed with a slit lamp examination of the anterior segment, dilated fundus examination, and intraocular pressure measurement. OCT, fundus fluorescein angiography (FFA), and fundus photography are helpful to determine the location and depth of the hemorrhage. One should suspect abusive head trauma if a child younger than three shows retinal hemorrhages with an intracranial injury.

Submacular hemorrhage patients often present with decreased central vision, sometimes 20/200 or worse. On a dilated fundus examination, submacular hemorrhage can be observed as an elevation of the retina, which can also be associated with a hemorrhagic detachment of the retinal pigment epithelium.

== Treatment ==
Subconjunctival hemorrhage requires no treatment and will resolve on its own within two weeks.

Hyphema treatment begins with head elevation to about 30 degrees, including while sleeping. An eye shield should also be placed and worn until the hyphema has completely resolved.

Vitreous hemorrhages are treated by targeting the underlying cause, such as with laser photo-coagulation for proliferative diabetic retinopathy or retinal detachment. Occasionally, a hemorrhage does not resolve on its own, and vitrectomy surgery—which removes the vitreous and replaces it with a saltwater solution similar to the eye's natural fluids—becomes necessary.

Subretinal hemorrhages do not always require immediate treatment. Those that do not obscure or threaten vision can be monitored to evaluate their progression in size and number, but the primary disorder behind the hemorrhages needs to be diagnosed and addressed. Direct intervention is indicated for hemorrhages with the potential to permanently damage vision.

Treatment for submacular hemorrhages depends on the severity of the injury and pre-existing macular function. Damage to the retina can occur in as little as 24 hours. Overall, the window of opportunity for successful recovery is thought to be within the first two weeks of onset.

== Prognosis ==
Prognosis depends on the location of the bleed, the amount of bleeding, the rate of clearing of blood, whether the blood is affecting visual acuity, complications (such as corneal staining, retinal detachment, pre-retinal fibrosis, ischemic optic atrophy, or glaucoma), and the severity of involvement of the macular region.

Subconjunctival hemorrhage will resolve on its own within two weeks.

Hyphema has a relatively good prognosis. Most patients will fully recover, but complications are more likely in those with comorbidities such as sickle cell disease or other diseases that lead to an increase in the size of the hyphema.

Vitreous hemorrhages normally require no treatment. The blood typically clears by itself and vision is restored, though this may take up to several months. In more severe cases, or if the hemorrhage does not clear up as expected, an eye doctor may perform a vitrectomy.

Subretinal hemorrhage secondary to age-related macular degeneration (AMD) has a poor visual prognosis. Surgery to drain the blood will only improve visual acuity in some patients.

Submacular hemorrhage patients with an otherwise healthy retinal pigment epithelium (RPE) and photoreceptors will recover the most visual function. The prognosis is often poor in cases of advanced AMD due to underlying RPE disease, even with successful clearing and removal of the hemorrhage.

== Epidemiology ==
Traumatic eye injury can cause intraocular hemorrhage in people of any age and gender. However, injuries tend to be more common in young males due to more outdoor activities and heavy work. They are also more common in children during the summer.

The incidence of traumatic hyphema is approximately 12 per 100,000. Males are three to five times more affected than females.

The annual incidence of vitreous hemorrhage is 7 per 1,000,000. In the Chinese population, it occurs at a much higher rate of 4.8 cases per 10,000 person-years. Incidence is greater with age (mainly 40 to 59 years), male gender, and use of anticoagulants.

Subretinal hemorrhage in adults is most often seen after 40 years of age, when systemic disorders become more common. Retinal hemorrhages were seen in 30% of physically abused children, most under six months of age. Birth-related retinal hemorrhages are seen in 25% of newborns with normal delivery and 40–50% of newborns with instrumental deliveries.

Submacular hemorrhage typically occurs in elderly patients with exudative age-related macular degeneration, macroaneurysms, or polypoidal choroidal vasculopathy, and in all populations in cases of trauma.

== Research ==
Research has shown a link between intraocular hemorrhages and medications including warfarin and new oral anticoagulants.

Eighty cases of intraocular hemorrhage (vitreous, choroidal, or retinal) were identified with warfarin in the World Health Organization's Vigibase database from 1968–2015. There were a total of 156 cases with new oral anticoagulants (82 with rivaroxaban, 65 with dabigatran, and 9 with apixaban). Warfarin had the highest reports of suprachoroidal hemorrhage. Rivaroxaban and dabigatran had the highest reports of retinal and vitreous hemorrhage. Apixaban also had high reports of retinal and vitreous hemorrhage, but the number of cases reported was too small to make a meaningful impact.

The incidence of intraocular hemorrhage is higher with warfarin and new oral anticoagulants than with other drugs in the World Health Organization's database. The high rate of choroidal hemorrhage associated with warfarin is likely due to the drug's long-term use. Rivaroxaban had a high number of reports of retinal and vitreous hemorrhage despite the fact that it was approved by the Food and Drug Administration a year later than dabigatran, suggesting a higher risk in patients taking rivaroxaban than patients taking dabigatran. Apixaban had the least association with either condition. This may be because it is the most recent of the drug class to be approved by the FDA (as of 2012).

Research into hemorrhages in abused infants has found that infants with intracranial injuries usually present with abnormal central nervous system signs, intracranial hemorrhage, and intraocular hemorrhage. Several studies have found that the reported incidence of child abuse is inaccurate due to a lack of complete and proper investigation of childhood fatalities, as well as poor reporting to state agencies. In one study, optic nerve sheath hemorrhage was present in all 13 infants with non-accidental intracranial injury, and multilayered retinal hemorrhage was present in at least one eye of 11 of the 13 infants.

Hyphema is a complication that can occur after glaucoma filtering surgery, although the causes are not always well known. In some cases, abnormal vessels have been detected at the internal margin of the trabeculectomy opening, and they are assumed to be the cause of the hemorrhage.
