= Posterior vitreous detachment =

Eye condition where vitreous membrane detaches from the retina

- Schematic diagram of the human eye.
- Specialty: Ophthalmology
- Symptoms: Sudden increase in the number of eye floaters.; A ring of floaters at the temporal side of the central vision.; Photopsia (flashes of light)

A posterior vitreous detachment (PVD) is a condition of the eye in which the vitreous membrane separates from the retina. It refers to the separation of the posterior hyaloid membrane from the retina anywhere posterior to the vitreous base (a 3–4 mm wide attachment to the ora serrata).

The condition is common for older adults; over 75% of those over the age of 65 develop it. Although less common among people in their 40s or 50s, the condition is not rare for those individuals. Some research has found that the condition is more common among women.

== Symptoms and signs ==
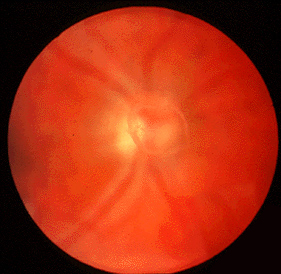
Weiss ring: a large, ring shaped floater that is sometimes seen if the vitreous body releases from the back of the eye

When this occurs there is a characteristic pattern of symptoms:

- Flashes of light (photopsia)
- A sudden dramatic increase in the number of floaters
- A ring of floaters or hairs just to the temporal side of the central vision

== Causes ==
The vitreous (Latin for "glassy") humor is a gel which fills the eye behind the lens. Between it and the retina is the vitreous membrane. With age the vitreous humor changes, shrinking and developing pockets of liquefaction, similar to the way a gelatin dessert shrinks and detaches from the edge of a pan. At some stage the vitreous membrane may peel away from the retina. The American Society of Retina Specialists has the described the way PVD can progress as follows:

If a PVD progresses gently, gradually, and uniformly, the symptoms are typically mild. However, if the forces of separation are strong or concentrated in a particular part of the retina, or if there is an abnormal adhesion (sticking together) between the vitreous gel and the retina (such as lattice degeneration), the PVD can tear the retina or a retinal blood vessel.

Age and refractive error play a role in determining the onset of PVD in a healthy person. PVD is rare in emmetropic people under the age of 40 years, and increases with age to 86% in the 90s. Several studies have found a broad range of incidence of PVD, from 20% of autopsy cases to 57% in a more elderly population of patients (average age was 83.4 years).

People with myopia (nearsightedness) greater than 6 diopters are at higher risk of PVD at all ages. Posterior vitreous detachment does not directly threaten vision. Even so, it is of increasing interest because the interaction between the vitreous body and the retina might play a decisive role in the development of major pathologic vitreoretinal conditions, such as epiretinal membrane.

PVD may also occur in cases of cataract surgery, within weeks or months of the surgery.

The vitreous membrane is more firmly attached to the retina anteriorly, at a structure called the vitreous base. The membrane does not normally detach from the vitreous base, although it can be detached with extreme trauma. However, the vitreous base may have an irregular posterior edge. When the edge is irregular, the forces of the vitreous membrane peeling off the retina can become concentrated at small posterior extensions of the vitreous base. Similarly, in some people with retinal lesions such as lattice retinal degeneration or chorio-retinal scars, the vitreous membrane may be abnormally adherent to the retina. If enough traction occurs the retina may tear at these points. If there are only small point tears, these can allow glial cells to enter the vitreous humor and proliferate to create a thin epiretinal membrane that distorts vision. In more severe cases, vitreous fluid may seep under the tear, separating the retina from the back of the eye, creating a retinal detachment. Trauma can be any form from a blunt force trauma to the face such as a boxer's punch or even in some cases has been known to be from extremely vigorous coughing or blowing of the nose.

== Diagnosis ==
Posterior vitreous detachment is diagnosed via dilated eye examination. For some patients the vitreous gel is extremely clear and so it can be hard to see the PVD. In these cases, additional imaging such as optical coherence tomography (OCT) or ocular ultrasound are used.

== Treatment ==
Therapy is not required or indicated in posterior vitreous detachment, unless there are associated retinal tears, which need to be repaired. In absence of retinal tears, the usual progress is that the vitreous humor will continue to age and liquefy and floaters will usually become less noticeable, and eventually most symptoms will completely disappear. Prompt examination of patients experiencing vitreous humor floaters combined with expeditious treatment of any retinal tears has been suggested as the most effective means of preventing certain types of retinal detachments.

== See also ==
- Vitreous membrane
- Central serous retinopathy
- Epiretinal membrane
- Vitrectomy
- Floater
