= Retinal tuft =

Vitreoretinal eye defect that can lead to retinal tears

- Specialty: Ophthalmology
- Complications: Retinal detachment
- Types: Cystic, non-cystic, zonular traction
- Diagnostic method: Dilated eye examination, retinal scan
- Frequency: 5%

Retinal tuft (vitroretinal tuft) is a disorder or degeneration of the retina in the eye. Retinal tufts are classified as peripheral retinal degeneration, and can be categorized as either cystic or zonular tractional. Retinal tufts can be visualized or diagnosed using a dilated eye examination and indirect ophthalmoscope or a widefield retinal scan. A retinal tuft is a gliotic degeneration of the retina composed of focal adhesions in the extracellular matrix joining the retina and the posterior hyaloid of the eye.

Retinal tufts are a common lesion of the retina; under 1% of these tufts are thought to lead to retinal detachment. The risk of a retinal detachment from a retinal tuft has been estimated to be about 0.28%, and usually no treatment for this condition is necessary.

Cystic retinal tufts affect 5% of the population and are thought to be a congenital abnormality in the retina. Cystic tufts are more commonly found under the vitreous base in the peripheral of the retina, but can also be found in other parts of the retina. In this condition, the retina can be stretched by the vitreous humor. Long term vitreous traction (stretching) of the retina is thought to be associated with increased risk of tears to the retina, or retinal detachment. Under a microscope looking at the histology of a cystic retinal tuft, an increase in glial cells, breaking down of the outer retina, and a loss in photoreceptor cells is often detected.

== Classification ==
Retinal tufts can classified into three subtypes: cystic, non-cystic, and zonular traction retinal tufts. Cystic tufts are usually larger than 0.1mm in length. Non-cystic retinal tufts are usually shorter, less than 0.1mm in length and are often clustered together in a series of projections within the vitreous base. Zonular traction retinal tufts are usually made up of thin individual strands that are usually in the vitreous base and extend over the area where the rod and cone of the eye end (ora serrata).

== Causes ==
Retinal tufts are related to pulling or traction of the vitreous humor. They are characterized by areas of gliotic degeneration on parts of the retina.

== Prognosis ==
Most retinal tufts are stable and do not change over time. Due to the traction that is placed on the vitreous humor, the retinal tuft may change in shape. Retinal tufts increase the risk of a retinal tear or a detached retina, although the risk is not high- 1% of tufts are thought to lead to retinal detachment. In addition if there is retinal thinning near a zonular traction tuft, there is an increased risk of retinal detachment.

Cystic tufts lead are often associated with an increased risk of rhegmatogenous retinal detachments.
