= Pachychoroid disorders of the macula =

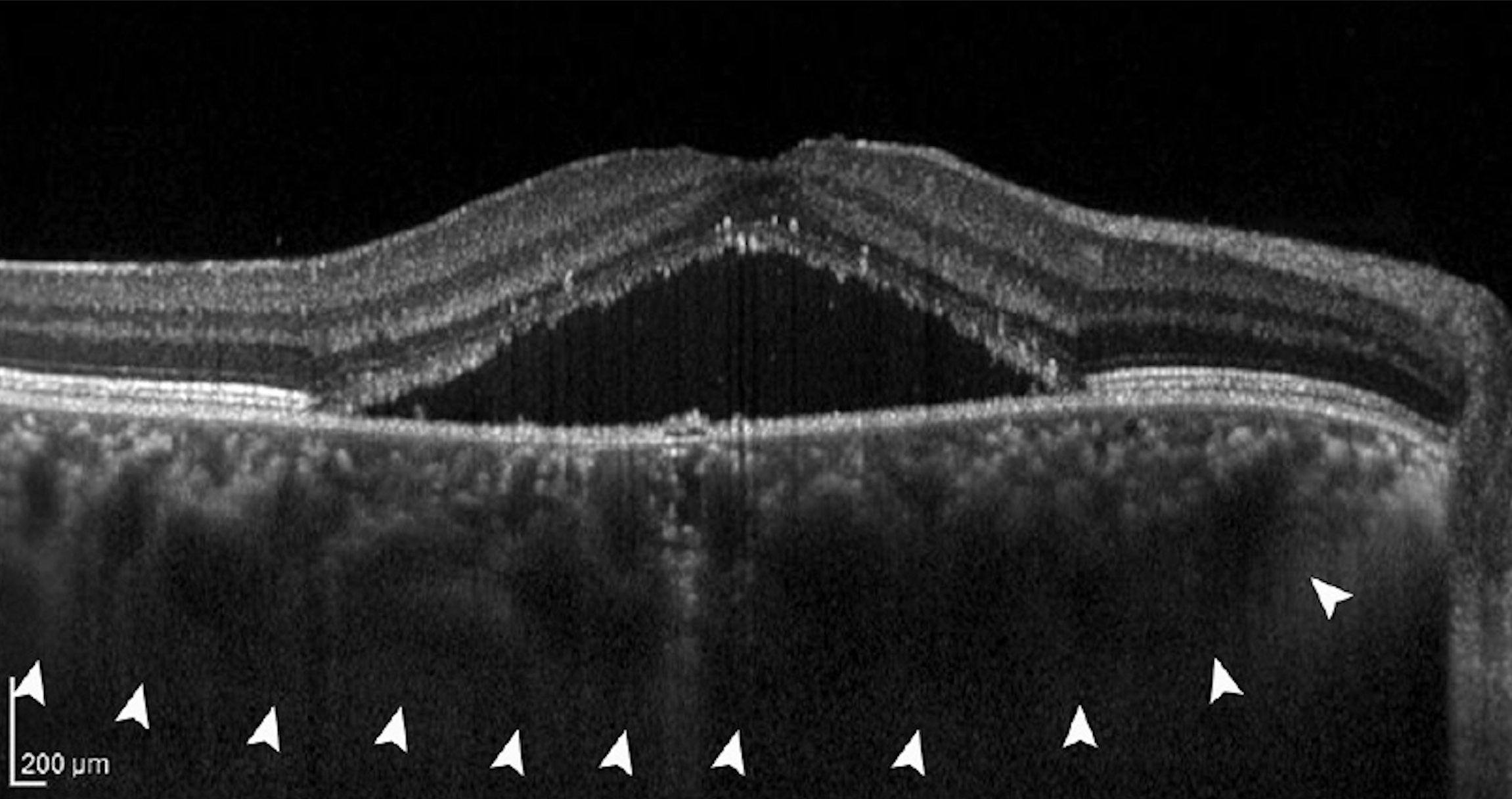
Central serous chorioretinopathy (pachychoroid stage II) with subretinal fluid (black triangle in the middle) and a markedly thickened, congested choroid (white arrowheads).

Pachychoroid disorders of the macula represent a group of diseases affecting the central part of the retina of the eye, the macula. Due to thickening and congestion of the highly vascularized layer underneath the macula, the choroid, damage to the retinal pigment epithelium and the retinal photoreceptor cells ensues. This leads to impaired vision. The best known representative of the pachychoroid disease spectrum, central serous chorioretinopathy, is the fourth most common cause of irreversible damage to the macula:.

The term "pachychoroid" was first introduced in 2013 by David Warrow, Quan Hoang and K. Bailey Freund.

== Disease mechanism ==
The disease mechanisms are not completely understood. All pachychoroid disorders of the macula show choroidal thickening and congestion with increased blood vessel diameter, especially in the deep choroid (the so-called Haller's layer). This results in increased pressure from the deep choroid against the superficial choroid close to the retina, damaging the fine blood vessels (capillaries) needed to supply oxygen and nutrients to the retinal pigment epithelium and retina. Additionally, fluid can leak from these damaged vessels and accumulate under the retina.

== Types of pachychoroid disorders ==
=== Uncomplicated pachychoroid ===
If only choroidal thickening is observed, usually to values exceeding 350 or 300 μm, but no damage to the surrounding structures is detected, eyes are classified as having an uncomplicated pachychoroid. It is assumed that a large part of the population has a thickened choroid without other signs of disease. This includes mainly young and far-sighted people, as choroidal thickness decreases with age and increasing axial length of the eye causing near-sightedness (myopia).

=== Complicated pachychoroid ===
Within the complicated pachychoroid spectrum, diseases of the centre of the retina, the macula, are the most common.

- If the continuous congestion in the blood vessel system of the choroid causes pressure damage to its fine blood vessels (capillaries) and a continuous leakage of fluid in the direction of the adjacent Bruch's membrane and retinal pigment epithelium, the resulting damage in the pigment epithelium, which can be seen on funducsopy or retinal imaging, is referred to as pachychoroid pigment epitheliopathy (PPE). Patients with PPE usually have no symptoms.
- If further damage to Bruch's membrane and the pigment epithelium causes fluid to accumulate under the retina, central serous chorioretinopathy (CSC) develops. In this stage, patients often have blurred vision and report a reduction in visual acuity with perception of a central "grey spot". In the majority of patients, spontaneous resolution of the subretinal fluid occurs within a few months, but recurs in up to 50% of cases. In some patients the fluid remains, making it a chronic disease; medical therapy or the application of various laser methods is possible.
- In about 25% of all patients with a chronic central serous chorioretinopathy, a proliferation of blood vessels from the choroid towards the retina can be detected (choroidal neovascularisation, CNV). CNV forms after an average of 17 years. This stage is called pachychoroid neovasculopathy (PNV), [4] which can cause a massive reduction in vision due to bleeding and scarring of the macula. Anti-VEGF therapy, which is injected directly into the eye (intravitreally), has proven to be an effective therapy in this case.
- If parts of the CNV vessel wall bulge outward, so-called aneurysms develop. This stage is called pachychoroidal aneurysmal type 1 CNV (PAT1), still widely referred to as polypoidal choroidal vasculopathy (PCV). This stage is the most aggressive one, causing irreversible vision loss due to a destruction of the macula, frequently involving retinal hemorrhage. Intense anti-VEGF-therapy, often in combination with a special laser treatment (photodynamic therapy) is effective to restore visual loss and/or slow visual decline.
- In all stages, focal choroidal excavation may occur, which probably represents a contraction of the choroid due to scarring processes.

Beyond the spectrum of pachychoroid disorders of the macula, pachychoroid phenotypes have also been described around the optic disc, causing fluid retention in the retina (peripapillary pachychoroid).

== Classification ==
The individual stages of the pachychoroid disease spectrum of the macula develop sequentially from the respective preliminary stage, and can partially recede with therapy. According to Siedlecki, Schworm and Priglinger, this disease continuum can be classified into four stages

	Pachychoroid spectrum disorders of the macula (after Siedlecki et al.)
0	Uncomplicated pachychoroid (UCP)
I	Pachychoroid pigmentepitheliopathy (PPE)
II	Central serous chorioretinopathy (CSC)
III	Pachychoroid neovasculopathy (PNV)
	a) with neurosensory detachment (=subretinal fluid)
	b) without neurosensory detachment (no subretinal fluid)
IV	Pachychoroid aneurysmal type 1 choroidal neovascularization (PAT1) (also polypoidal choroidal vasculopathy, PCV)
