= Floater =

Deposits within the eye's vitreous humour

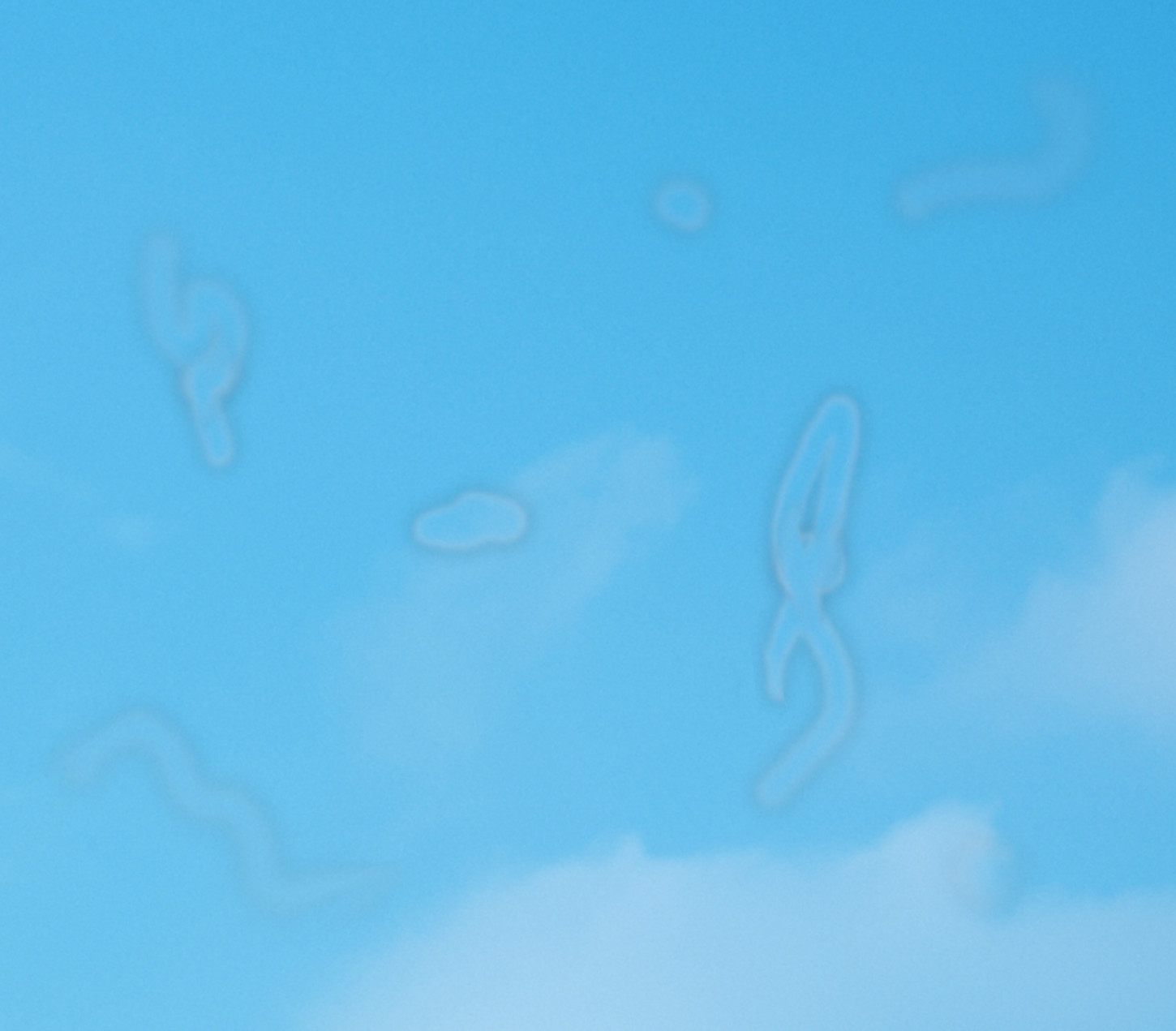
- Simulated image of separated, unclumped floaters against a blue sky
- Specialty: Ophthalmology, optometry
- Differential diagnosis: Migraine aura

Floaters or eye floaters are sometimes-visible deposits (e.g., the shadows of tiny structures of protein or other cell debris projected onto the retina) within the eye's vitreous humour ("the vitreous"), which is normally transparent, or between the vitreous and retina. They can become particularly noticeable when looking at a blank surface or an open monochromatic space, such as a blue sky. Each floater can be measured by its size, shape, consistency, refractive index, and motility. They are also called muscae volitantes (Latin for 'flying flies'), or mouches volantes (from the same phrase in French). The vitreous usually starts out transparent, but imperfections may gradually develop as one ages. The common type of floater, present in most people's eyes, is due to these degenerative changes of the vitreous. The perception of floaters, which may be annoying or problematic to some people, is known as myiodesopsia, or, less commonly, as myiodaeopsia, myodeopsia, or myodesopsia. It is not often treated, except in severe cases, where vitrectomy (surgery) and laser vitreolysis may be effective.

Floaters are visible either because of the shadows that imperfections cast on the retina, or because of the refraction of light that passes through them, and can appear alone or together with several others as a clump in one's visual field. They may appear as spots, threads, or fragments of "cobwebs", which float slowly before the observer's eyes, and move especially in the direction the eyes move. As these objects exist within the eye itself, they are not optical illusions but are entoptic phenomena (caused by the eye itself). They are not to be confused with visual snow, which is similar to the static on a television screen, although these two conditions may coexist as part of a number of visual disturbances which include starbursts, trails, and afterimages.

== Signs and symptoms ==
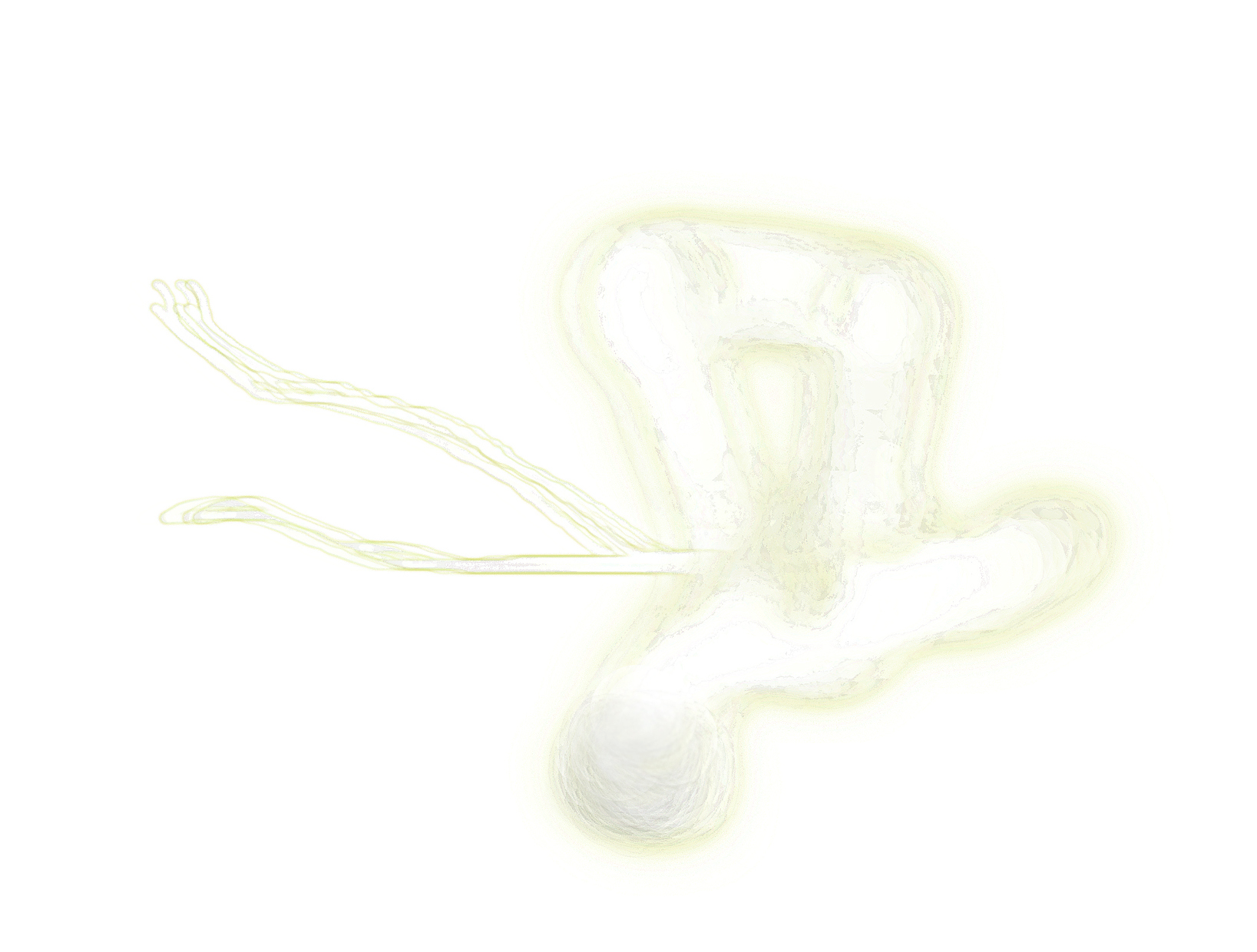
Artistic representation of a floater

External videos
- What are those floaty things in your eye? - Michael Mauser, 4:04, TED-Ed

Floaters are from objects in pockets of liquid within the vitreous humour, the thick fluid or gel that fills the eye, or between the vitreous and the retina. The vitreous humour, or vitreous body, is a jelly-like, transparent substance that fills the majority of the eye. It lies within the vitreous chamber behind the lens, and is one of the four optical components of the eye. Thus, floaters follow the rapid motions of the eye, while drifting slowly within the pocket of liquid. When they are first noticed, the natural reaction is to attempt to look directly at them. However, attempting to shift one's gaze toward them can be difficult because floaters follow the motion of the eye, remaining to the side of the direction of gaze. Floaters are, in fact, visible only because they do not remain perfectly fixed within the eye. Although the blood vessels of the eye also obstruct light, they are invisible under normal circumstances because they are fixed in location relative to the retina, and the brain "tunes out" stabilized images through neural adaptation.

Floaters are particularly noticeable when looking at a blank surface or an open monochromatic space, such as blue sky. Despite the name "floaters", many of these specks have a tendency to sink toward the bottom of the eyeball, in whichever way the eyeball is oriented; the supine position (looking up or lying back) tends to concentrate them near the fovea, which is the center of gaze, while the textureless and evenly lit sky forms an ideal background against which to view them. The brightness of the daytime sky also causes the eyes' pupils to contract, reducing the aperture, which makes floaters less blurry and easier to see.

Floaters present at birth usually remain lifelong, while those that appear later may disappear within weeks or months. They are not uncommon, and do not cause serious problems for most people. A 2002 survey of optometrists located in the English Midlands area suggested that for the average optometrist, approximately 8% of patients seen in a month present with symptoms of floaters. However, floaters are more than a nuisance and a distraction to those with severe cases, especially if the spots seem constantly to drift through the field of vision. The shapes are shadows projected onto the retina by tiny structures of protein or other cell debris discarded over the years and trapped in the vitreous humour or between the vitreous and retina. In some cases, floaters can even be seen when the eyes are closed on especially bright days, when sufficient light penetrates the eyelids to cast the shadows. It is not, however, only elderly persons who are troubled by floaters; they can also become a problem to younger people, especially if they are myopic. They are also common after cataract or clear lens extraction operations or after trauma.

Floaters are able to catch and refract light in ways that somewhat blur vision temporarily until the floater moves to a different area. Often they trick persons who are troubled by floaters into thinking they see something out of the corner of their eye that really is not there. Most people come to terms with the problem, after a time, and learn to ignore their floaters. For persons with severe floaters it is nearly impossible to ignore completely the large masses that constantly stay within almost direct view.

In the case of young people, particularly those under 35, symptomatic floaters are likely suspended within a posterior region of the eye known as the pre-macular bursa. Such floaters appear well-defined and usually bear the appearance of a 'crystal worm' or cobweb. Due to their proximity to the retina, the floaters have a significant effect on the visual field for patients. In addition, such floaters are often in the central visual axis as it moves with the intravitreal currents of the eye. Research on floaters of the pre-macular bursa is minimal, and safe treatment for patients with this disturbance that does not warrant major vitrectomy has yet to be discovered. Moreover, the cause and prognosis for such floaters also remains to be found. Some doctors suggest such floaters may resolve over time, should the floaters move away from the retina.

== Causes ==
There are various causes for the appearance of floaters, of which the most common are described here.

Floaters can occur when eyes age; in rare cases, floaters may be a sign of retinal detachment or a retinal tear.

=== Vitreous syneresis ===
Vitreous syneresis (liquefaction) and contraction with age can cause vitreous floaters. Additionally, trauma or injury to the globe can cause them.

=== Vitreous detachments ===
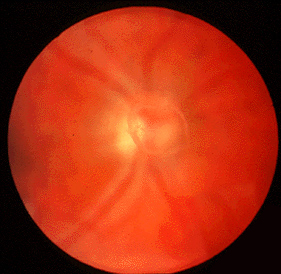
Weiss ring: a large, ring shaped floater that is sometimes seen if the vitreous body releases from the back of the eye

As part of the normal human aging process the liquefied vitreous body loses support and contracts. This leads to posterior vitreous detachment in which the vitreous membrane is released from the sensory retina. During this detachment, the shrinking vitreous can stimulate the retina mechanically, causing the patient to see random flashes across the visual field, sometimes referred to as "flashers", a symptom more formally referred to as photopsia. The ultimate release of the vitreous around the optic nerve head sometimes makes a large floater appear, usually in the shape of a ring ("Weiss ring").

Posterior vitreous detachment is more common in people who:

- are nearsighted;
- have undergone cataract surgery or clear lens extraction;
- have had Nd:YAG laser surgery of the eye;
- have had inflammation inside the eye.

=== Retinal detachment ===
As a complication of Vitreous detachment, part of the retina might be torn off by the departing vitreous membrane causing a retinal detachment. A retinal tear may also allow fluid to leak behind the retina, causing it to detach. This will often leak blood into the vitreous, which is seen by the patient as a sudden appearance of numerous small black dots or ribbons moving across the field of vision. Sometimes a gray curtain may appear to partially block vision in one eye. Retinal detachment requires immediate medical attention, as it can easily cause blindness. Consequently, both the appearance of flashes and the sudden onset of numerous small floaters should be rapidly investigated by an eye care provider, preferably a retinal ophthalmologist.

=== Regression of the hyaloid artery ===
The hyaloid artery, an artery running through the vitreous humour during the fetal stage of development, regresses in the third trimester of pregnancy. Its disintegration can sometimes leave cell matter.

=== Other common causes ===
Patients with retinal tears may experience floaters if red blood cells are released from leaky blood vessels, and those with uveitis or vitritis, as in toxoplasmosis, may experience multiple floaters and decreased vision due to the accumulation of white blood cells in the vitreous humour.

Other causes for floaters include cystoid macular edema and asteroid hyalosis. The latter is an anomaly of the vitreous humour, whereby calcium clumps attach themselves to the collagen network. The bodies that are formed in this way move slightly with eye movement, but then return to their fixed position.

== Diagnosis ==
Floaters are often readily observed by an ophthalmologist or an optometrist with the use of an ophthalmoscope or slit lamp. However, if the floater is near the retina, it may not be visible to the observer even if it appears large to the patient.

Increasing background illumination or using a pinhole to effectively decrease pupil diameter may allow a person to obtain a better view of his or her own floaters. The head may be tilted in such a way that one of the floaters drifts towards the central axis of the eye. In the sharpened image the fibrous elements are more conspicuous.

The presence of retinal tears with new onset of floaters was surprisingly high (14%; 95% confidence interval, 12–16%) as reported in a meta-analysis published as part of the Rational Clinical Examination Series in the Journal of the American Medical Association. Patients with new onset flashes and/or floaters, especially when associated with visual loss or restriction in the visual field, should seek more urgent ophthalmologic evaluation.

== Treatment ==
While surgeries do exist to correct for severe cases of floaters, there are no medications (including eye drops) that can correct for this vitreous deterioration. Floaters are often caused by the normal aging process and will usually become less bothersome as a person learns to ignore them. Looking up/down and left/right will cause the floaters to leave the direct field of vision as the vitreous humour swirls around due to the sudden movement. If floaters significantly increase in numbers and/or severely affect vision, then one of the treatments below may be necessary.

As of 2017, insufficient evidence is available to compare the safety and efficacy of surgical vitrectomy with laser vitreolysis for the treatment of floaters. A 2017 Cochrane Review did not find any relevant studies that compared the two treatments.

Aggressive marketing campaigns have promoted the use of laser vitreolysis for the treatment of floaters. No strong evidence currently exists for the treatment of floaters with laser vitreolysis. The strongest available evidence comparing these two treatment modalities are retrospective case series.

=== Surgery ===
Vitrectomy may be successful in treating severe cases. The technique usually involves making three openings through the part of the sclera and pars plana portion of the ciliary body. Of these small gauge instruments, one is an infusion port to resupply a saline solution and maintain the pressure of the eye, the second is a fiber optic light source, and the third is a vitrector. The vitrector has a reciprocating cutting tip attached to a suction device. This design reduces traction on the retina via the vitreous material. A variant sutureless, self-sealing technique is usually used.

Like most invasive surgical procedures, however, vitrectomy carries some risk of complications, including: retinal detachment, anterior vitreous detachment and macular edema – which can threaten vision or worsen existing floaters (in the case of retinal detachment).

=== Laser vitreolysis ===
Laser vitreolysis is a possible treatment option for the removal of vitreous strands and opacities (floaters). In this procedure an ophthalmic laser (usually a yttrium aluminium garnet (YAG) laser) applies a series of nanosecond pulses of low-energy laser light to evaporate the vitreous opacities and to sever the vitreous strands. When performed with a YAG laser designed specifically for vitreolysis, reported side effects and complications associated with vitreolysis are rare. However, YAG lasers have traditionally been designed for use in the anterior portion of the eye, i.e. posterior capsulotomy and iridotomy treatments. As a result, they often provide a limited view of the vitreous, which can make it difficult to identify the targeted floaters and membranes. They also carry a high risk of damage to surrounding ocular tissue. Accordingly, vitreolysis is not widely practised, being performed by very few specialists. One of them, John Karickhoff, has performed the procedure more than 1,400 times and claims a 90 percent success rate. However, the MedicineNet web site states that "there is no evidence that this [laser treatment] is effective. The use of a laser also poses significant risks to the vision in what is otherwise a healthy eye."

=== Medication ===
Enzymatic vitreolysis has been trialed to treat vitreomacular adhesion (VMA) and anomalous posterior vitreous detachment. Although the mechanism of action may have an effect on clinically significant floaters, as of March 2015 there are no clinical trials being undertaken to determine whether this may be a therapeutic alternative to either conservative management or vitrectomy.

=== Atropine ===
Dropping low doses of atropine onto the eye dilates the pupil, thus reducing shadow formation on the retina by floaters.

== Research ==
The VDM project aims to find an effective, low-risk treatment for floaters. So far, there have been studies using colloidal gold or indocyanine green (ICG) injected into the eye followed by a low-energy laser to target problematic floaters, and this has shown to be successful on vitreous opacities obtained during vitrectomy and in rabbits.

== Epidemiology ==
A vitreous detachment typically affects patients older than the age of 50 and increases in prevalence by age 80. Individuals who are myopic or nearsighted have an increased risk of vitreous floaters. Additionally, eyes with an inflammatory disease after direct trauma to the globe or have recently undergone eye surgery have an increased chance of developing a vitreous floater. Men and women appear to be affected equally.

== In other animals ==
It has been theorized that non-human animals are capable of seeing floaters, as most mammals have eye structures anatomically similar to humans. However, floaters in animals are capable of damaging their vision. Animals with synchysis have an increased risk for retinal detachment and may also require surgery.

== See also ==
- Blue field entoptic phenomenon, alias Scheerer's phenomenon – tiny bright dots moving quickly in the visual field
- Ocular straylight
- Phosphene
- Scotoma
- Synchysis scintillans
