= Focal choroidal excavation =

Eye disease characterized by concavity of the choroid

- Specialty: Ophthalmology
- Diagnostic method: optical coherence tomography
- Treatment: Usually observation without treatment

Focal choroidal excavation (FCE) is a concavity in the choroidal layer of the eye that can be detected by optical coherence tomography. The disease is usually unilateral and not associated with any accompanying systemic diseases.

== Classification ==
There are three types of classification systems used to classify FCE.

If there is no separation between photoreceptor outer segments and the retinal pigment epithelium (RPE), it is classified as conforming and if there is a space it is considered as non-conforming.

Based on shape of the choroidal concavity FCE can be classified as cone-shaped, bowl-shaped, or mixed morphology. Based on the location of the lesion, it can be classified as foveal or extrafoveal.

== Signs and symptoms ==
In FCE, visual acuity may be normal and the overlying retina may also appear normal.

== Etiology ==
The exact etiology of FCE is still (as of 2022) unknown. It was previously considered a congenital disease, but later it was suggested that FCEs can also occur with choroidal atrophy and choroiditis.

== Pathophysiology ==
Focal choroidal excavation (FCE) is a concavity in the choroidal layer of the eye without posterior staphyloma or scleral ectasia, that can be detected by optical coherence tomography. The concavity is commonly seen in the macular region. The disease is usually unilateral and not associated with any accompanying systemic diseases.

Choroidal vascular disorders which cause visual symptoms, including central serous chorioretinopathy (CSCR), choroidal neovascularization (CNV), and polypoidal choroidal vasculopathy (PCV) may also present with focal choroidal excavation.

== Diagnosis ==
Focal choroidal excavation can be diagnosed using fundus imaging techniques like optical coherence tomography.

== Treatment ==
Asymptomatic FCE without any other choroidal or retinal changes, observation is only recommended. If the lesion expands or the sclera thickens, rule out other underlying causes and treat it.

== History ==
Jampol et al. first identified the lesion in 2006. Margolis et al. named the condition as focal choroidal excavation. Later Shinojima et al. described a classification system based on shape of the choroidal concavity.
