= Asteroid hyalosis =

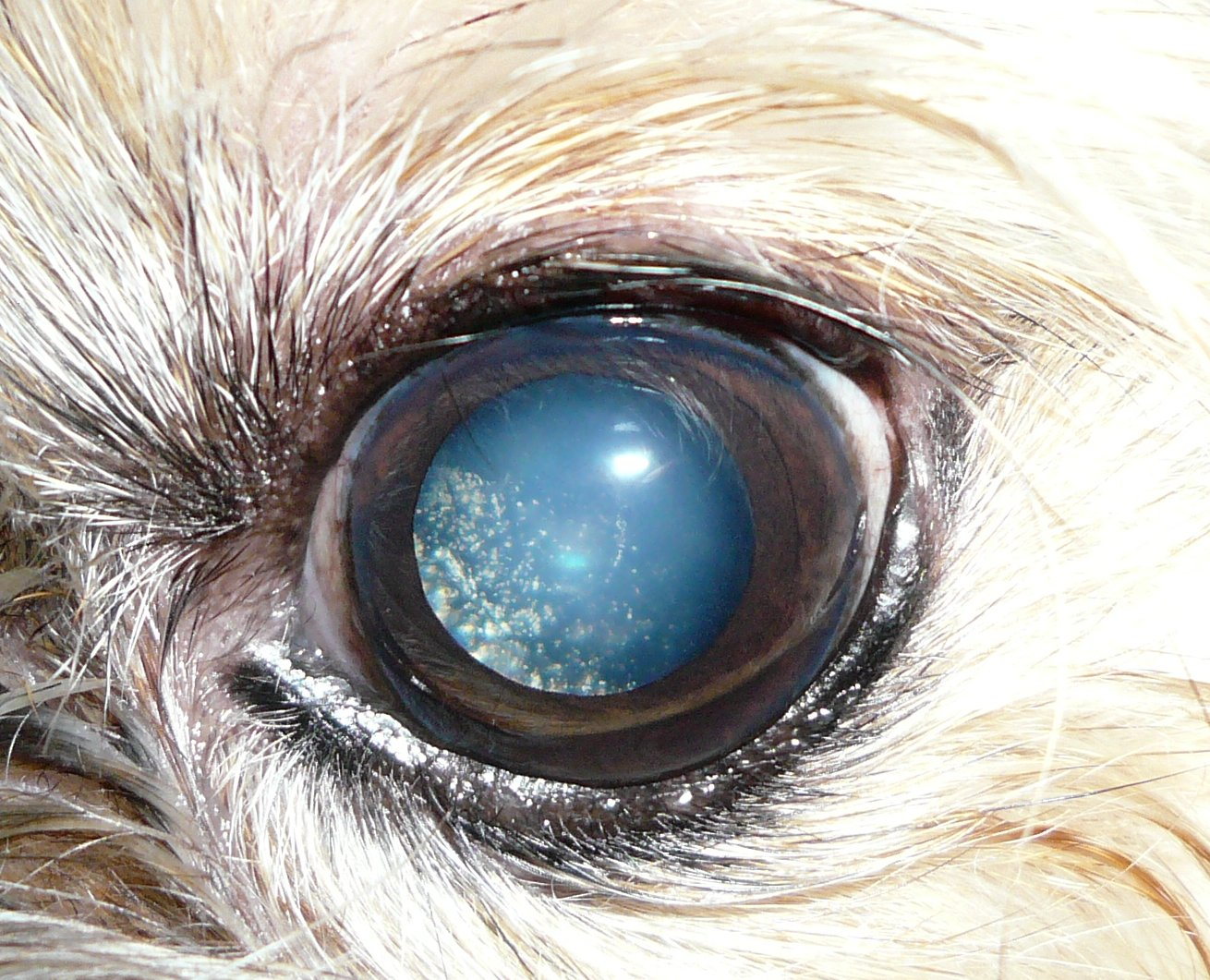
- Asteroid hyalosis in a Yorkshire Terrier
- Specialty: Ophthalmology

Asteroid hyalosis is a degenerative condition of the eye involving small white opacities in the vitreous humor. It is known to occur in humans, dogs, cats, horses, and chinchillas. Clinically, these opacities are quite refractile, giving the appearance of stars shining in the night sky—except that ocular asteroids are often quite mobile. Ocular asteroids must be distinguished from the more common typical vitreous floaters, which are usually fibrillar or cellular condensates. The cause of asteroid hyalosis is unknown, but it has been associated with diabetes mellitus, hypertension, hypercholesterolemia, and, in certain animals, tumors of the ciliary body. In dogs, asteroid hyalosis is considered to be an age-related change. The asteroid bodies are made up of hydroxyapatite, which in turn consists of calcium and phosphates or phospholipids. While asteroid hyalosis does not usually severely affect vision, the floating opacities can be quite annoying, and may interfere significantly with visualization and testing of the retina. While treatment of asteroid hyalosis is usually unnecessary, vitrectomy may occasionally be indicated, for both diagnostic and therapeutic purposes.

== See also ==
- Synchysis scintillans
