= Central serous chorioretinopathy =

Eye disease characterized by leakage of fluid under the retina

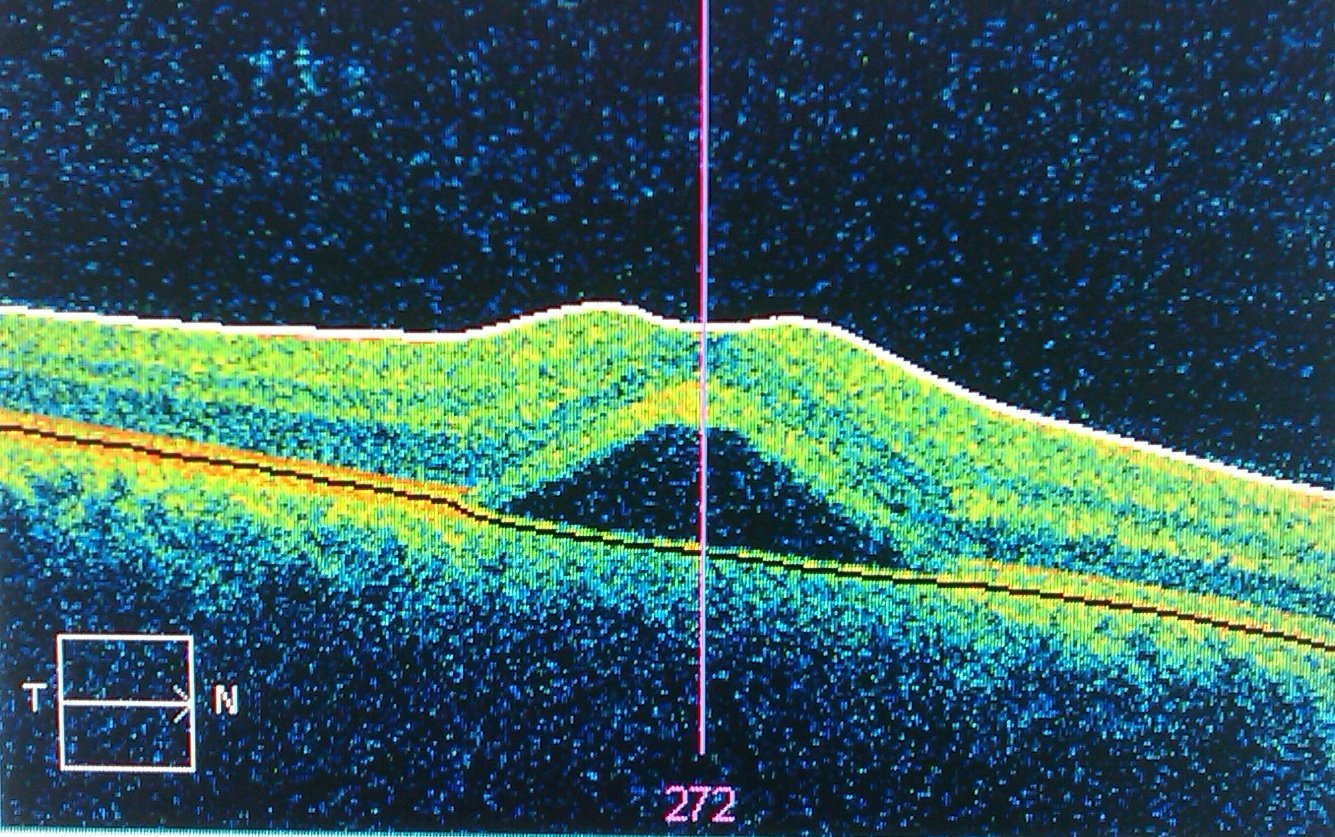
- An occurrence of central serous retinopathy of the fovea centralis imaged using optical coherence tomography.
- Specialty: Ophthalmology

Central serous chorioretinopathy (CSC or CSCR), also known as central serous retinopathy (CSR), is an eye disease that causes visual impairment, often temporary, usually in one eye. When the disorder is active, it is characterized by leakage of fluid under the retina that has a propensity to accumulate under the central macula. This results in blurred or distorted vision (metamorphopsia). A blurred or gray spot in the central visual field is common when the retina is detached. Reduced visual acuity may persist after the fluid has disappeared.

The disease is considered of unknown cause. It mostly affects white males in the age group 20 to 50 (male:female ratio 6:1) and occasionally other groups. The condition is believed to be exacerbated by stress or corticosteroid use.

== Pathophysiology ==
Recently, central serous chorioretinopathy has been understood to be part of the pachychoroid spectrum. In pachychoroid spectrum disorders, of which CSC represents stage II, the choroid, the highly vascularized layer below the retina, is thickened and congested with increased blood vessel diameter, especially in the deep choroid (the so-called Haller's layer). This results in increased pressure from the deep choroid against the superficial choroid close to the retina, damaging the fine blood vessels (capillaries) needed to supply oxygen and nutrients to the retinal pigment epithelium and retina. Additionally, fluid can leak from these damaged vessels and accumulate under the retina.

Different stages of the pachychoroid are defined depending on the amount of cumulative damage. If there are defects in the retinal pigment epithelium without accumulation of fluid below the retina, a pachychoroid pigment epitheliopathy (PPE) is present. Accumulation of fluid results in central serous chorioretinopathy (CSC). The development of secondary blood vessels, so-called choroidal neovascularization (CNV) leads to pachychoroid neovasculopathy (PNV). If parts of these new vessels bulge outward, so-called aneurysms develop within this CNV, defining pachychoroid aneurysmal type 1 CNV (or, still widely used, polypoidal choroidal vasculopathy (PCV)).

Since the individual stages develop one after the other from the respective preliminary stage, pachychoroidal diseases of the macula are divided into 4 stages according to Siedlecki, Schworm and Priglinger:

	Pachychoroid spectrum disorders of the macula (after Siedlecki et al.)
0	Uncomplicated pachychoroid (UCP)
I	Pachychoroid pigment epitheliopathy (PPE)
II	Central serous chorioretinopathy (CSC)
III	Pachychoroid neovasculopathy (PNV)
	a) with neurosensory detachment (subretinal fluid)
	b) without neurosensory detachment (no subretinal fluid)
IV	Pachychoroid aneurysmal type 1 choroidal neovascularization (PAT1) (also polypoidal choroidal vasculopathy, PCV)

== Risk factors ==
CSC is sometimes called idiopathic CSC which means that its cause is unknown. Nevertheless, stress appears to play an important role. An oft-cited but potentially inaccurate conclusion is that persons in stressful occupations, such as airplane pilots, have a higher incidence of CSC.

CSC has also been associated with cortisol and corticosteroids. Persons with CSC have higher levels of cortisol. Cortisol is a hormone secreted by the adrenal cortex that allows the body to deal with stress, which may explain the CSC-stress association. There is extensive evidence to the effect that corticosteroids (e.g. cortisone), commonly used to treat inflammations, allergies, skin conditions and even certain eye conditions, can trigger CSC, aggravate it and cause relapses. A study of 60 persons with Cushing's syndrome found CSC in 3 (5%). Cushing's syndrome is characterized by very high cortisol levels. Certain sympathomimetic drugs have also been associated with causing the disease.

Evidence has also implicated Helicobacter pylori (see gastritis) as playing a role. It would appear that the presence of the bacteria is well correlated with visual acuity and other retinal findings following an attack.

Evidence also shows that people with MPGN type II kidney disease can develop retinal abnormalities, including CSC caused by deposits of the same material that originally damaged the glomerular basement membrane in the kidneys.

== Diagnosis ==
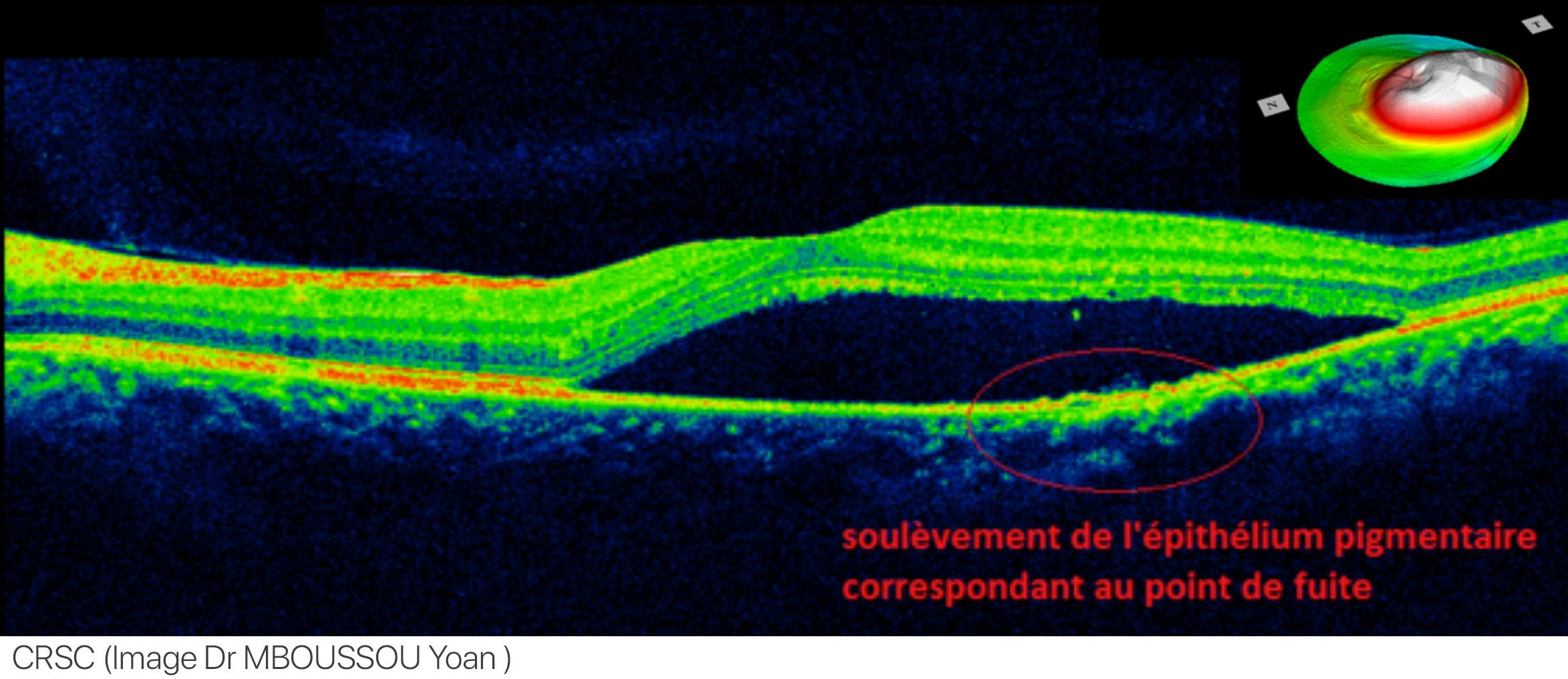
Optical coherence tomography imaging of central serous retinopathy

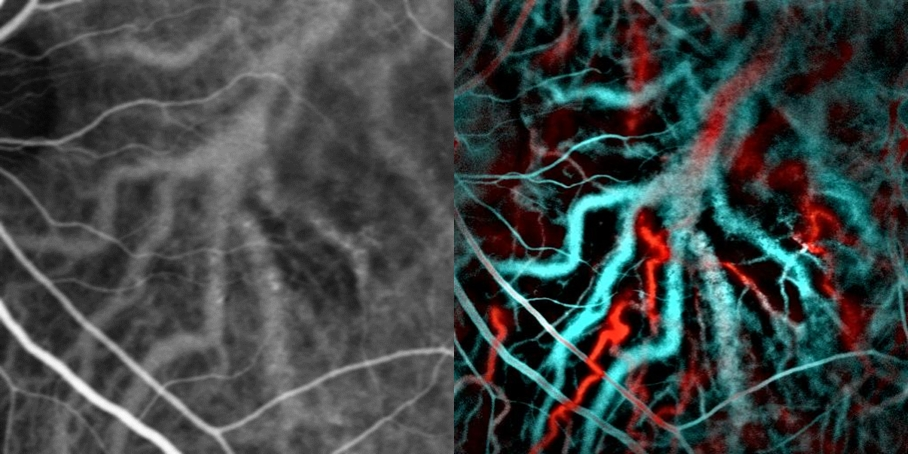
Indocyanine green angiography (left) and laser Doppler imaging (right) of the macula in central serous retinopathy, revealing choroidal vessels. Blue and red correspond to low and high blood flow, respectively.

The diagnosis usually starts with a dilated examination of the retina, followed by confirmation by optical coherence tomography, fluorescein angiography, and indocyanine green angiography. The angiography test will usually show one or more fluorescent spots with fluid leakage. In 10%-15% of the cases, these will appear in a classic smokestack shape. Differential diagnosis should be immediately performed to rule out retinal detachment, which is a medical emergency. A clinical record should be taken to keep a timeline of the detachment. The affected eye will sometimes exhibit a refractive spectacle prescription that is more far-sighted than the fellow eye due to the decreased focal length caused by the raising of the retina.

Indocyanine green angiography is a key diagnostic tool to assess the extent of choroidal abnormalities, showing different leakage patterns that correlate with disease severity and possibly treatment outcome. Laser Doppler imaging can be used to reveal the underlying swollen choroidal vessels under the retinal pigment epithelium and assess the health of the retina in the affected area which can be useful in making a treatment decision.

== Treatment ==
Any ongoing corticosteroid treatment should be tapered and stopped, where possible. It is important to check current medication, including nasal sprays and creams, for ingredients of corticosteroids; if found, seek advice from a medical practitioner for an alternative.

Most eyes with CSC undergo spontaneous resorption of subretinal fluid within 3–4 months. Recovery of visual acuity usually follows. Treatment should be considered if resorption does not occur within 3–4 months, spontaneously or as a result of counselling. The available evidence suggests that half-dose (or half-fluence) photodynamic therapy is the treatment of choice for CSC with subretinal fluid for longer than 3–4 months.

Due to the natural disease course of CSC – in which spontaneous resolution of subretinal fluid often occurs in first-episode cases – retrospective studies may erroneously report positive treatment outcomes and should, therefore, be evaluated with caution.

=== Laser treatments ===
Full-dose photodynamic therapy (PDT) with verteporfin was first described in CSC in 2003. Later, reduced-settings PDT (half-dose, half-fluence, and half-time) was found to have the same efficacy and a very low chance of complications. Follow-up studies have confirmed the treatment's long-term effectiveness including its effectiveness for the chronic variant of the disease. In the prospective randomized PLACE trial, half-dose photodynamic therapy was found to be superior compared to high-density subthreshold micropulse laser in chronic CSC, both with regard to anatomical and functional outcomes. In the prospective randomized SPECTRA trial, half-dose PDT was shown to be more successful in treating chronic CSC. At long-term follow-up, PDT in CSC is safe, also when treating the central macula (fovea). Indocyanine green angiography may be used to predict how the patient will respond to PDT.

Laser photocoagulation, which effectively burns the leak area shut (in contrast to PDT), may be considered in cases where there is little improvement in a 3- to 4-month duration, and the leakage is confined to a single or a few sources of leakage at a safe distance from the fovea. Laser photocoagulation is not indicated for cases where the leak is very near the central macula or for cases where the leakage is widespread and its source is difficult to identify. Laser photocoagulation can permanently damage vision where applied. Carefully tuned lasers can limit this damage. Even so, laser photocoagulation is not a preferred treatment for leaks in the central vision and is considered an outdated treatment by some doctors. Foveal attenuation has been associated with more than 4 months' duration of symptoms, however a better long-term outcome has not been demonstrated with laser photocoagulation than without photocoagulation.

In chronic cases, transpupillary thermotherapy has been suggested as an alternative to laser photocoagulation where the leak is in the central macula.

Yellow micropulse laser has shown promise in very limited retrospective trials.

A Cochrane review updated in 2025, seeking to compare the effectiveness of various treatments for CSC, found low-quality evidence that half-dose PDT treatment resulted in improved visual acuity and less recurrence of CSC in patients with acute CSC, compared to patients in the control group. The review also found benefits in micropulse laser treatments, where patients with acute and chronic CSC had improved visual acuity compared to control patients. The review did not demonstrate the superiority of one treatment option over another.

An evidence-based treatment guideline published in 2024 by an international expert panel concluded that half-dose or half-fluence PDT is the treatment of choice in chronic and recurrent CSC. Likewise, an international expert consensus-based guideline concluded that half-dose PDT is the preferred first-line treatment for chronic CSC.

=== Oral medications ===
Spironolactone is a mineralocorticoid receptor antagonist that may help reduce the fluid associated with CSC. In a retrospective study noted by Acta Ophthalmologica, spironolactone improved visual acuity in CSC patients over the course of 8 weeks.

Eplerenone is another mineralocorticoid receptor antagonist that has been thought to reduce the subretinal fluid that is present with CSC. In a study noted in the International Journal of Ophthalmology, results showed eplerenone decreased the subretinal fluid both horizontally and vertically over time. However, a large investigator-initiated randomized controlled trial (VICI) showed that eplerenone has no significant effect on chronic CSC.

=== Topical treatment ===
Though no topical treatment has been proven to be effective in the treatment of CSC. Some doctors have attempted to use nonsteroidal topical medications to reduce the subretinal fluid associated with CSC. The nonsteroidal topical medications that are sometimes used to treat CSC are ketorolac, diclofenac, or bromfenac, but the level of evidence to support their use is limited.

=== Lifestyle changes ===
People who have irregular sleep patterns, type A personalities, sleep apnea, or systemic hypertension have been described as being more susceptible to CSC, although the level of evidence to support lifestyle interventions such as stress reduction is limited.

== Prognosis ==
The prognosis for acute CSC is generally excellent. While immediate vision loss may be as poor as 20/200 in the affected eye, clinically, over 90% of patients regain 20/25 vision or better within 45 days. Once the fluid has resolved, either spontaneously or through treatment, distortion is reduced and visual acuity improves as the eye heals. However, some visual abnormalities can remain even where visual acuity is measured at 20/20. This includes localized reductions in light sensitivity as assessed by visual field testing (microperimetry). Lasting problems include decreased night vision, reduced color discrimination, and localized distortion caused by scarring of the sub-retinal layers. Complications include subretinal neovascularization and pigment epithelial detachment.

The disease can recur, causing progressive vision loss. The prognosis of chronic CSC is less favorable, with continued clinical consultation and treatment generally being advised.

== See also ==
- Diabetic retinopathy
- Geographic atrophy
- Hypertensive retinopathy
- Macular degeneration
- Posterior vitreous detachment
