= CSCR =

CSCR may refer to:

- Complexe sportif Claude-Robillard
- Central serous chorioretinopathy
- Carbon selective catalytic reduction
