= OPTC =

OPTC may refer to:

- One Piece Treasure Cruise
- Opticin, encoded by the OPTC gene
- U.S. Olympic & Paralympic Training Center
