= Hyalocyte =

Hyalocytes, also known as vitreous cells, are cells of the vitreous body, which is the clear gel that fills the space between the lens and the retina of the eye. Hyalocytes occur in the peripheral part of the vitreous body, and may produce hyaluronic acid and collagen fibrils, Hyalocytes are star-shaped (stellate) cells with oval nuclei.

The development of the vitreous is organized into three stages: primary, secondary, and tertiary. During the primary stage, which occurs from 3–6 weeks, the basic components of the vitreous begin to form from the mesenchyme embryonic cell layer. Hyalocytes likely develop from the vascular primary vitreous.

== See also ==
List of distinct cell types in the adult human body
