= Lawrence Yannuzzi =

Lawrence Yannuzzi is an American physician, ophthalmologist, and vitreo-retinal surgeon who is noted as an internationally recognized retinal specialist.

== Biography ==
Yannuzzi graduated from Harvard College. He graduated from the Boston University School of Medicine where he received an M.D. degree in 1964. He did a residency in ophthalmology at the Manhattan Eye, Ear and Throat Hospital from 1965 to 1968. He was board certified in ophthalmology in 1971.

He is married and has two sons and a daughter, who is a psychiatrist.

== Career ==
He is a professor of clinical ophthalmology at Columbia University College of Physicians and Surgeons, vice–chairman and director of The Retinal Research Center of the Manhattan Eye, Ear & Throat Hospital, and founder and president of The Macula Foundation.

Yannuzzi has published more than 550 scientific papers and 12 textbooks, with particular concentration in diseases of the macula such as diabetic retinopathy and age-related macular degeneration.

He is on the board of directors for Lighthouse International, a non-profit organization that does work in Vision Rehabilitation services, education, research, prevention and advocacy.

Yannuzzi is a pioneer in angiography. He and his colleagues are credited as describing and coining the term "idiopathic polypoidal choroidal vasculopathy", a particular type of hemorrhagic maculopathy.

== Academic appointments ==
Professor of Clinical Ophthalmology, NYU Professor of Clinical Ophthalmology, Columbia University
