= Vitreous base =

The vitreous base is an area in the fundus of the eye in which the vitreous membrane, neural retina, and pigment epithelium all are firmly adherent, one to the other. The vitreous membrane is more firmly attached to the retina anteriorly at the vitreous base. The vitreous membrane does not normally detach from the vitreous base, although it can be detached with extreme trauma. Vitreous base detachment is typically associated with blunt ocular trauma.
