= Opticin =

Protein found in humans

OPTC

Identifiers
- Aliases: OPTC, OPT, opticin
- External IDs: OMIM: 605127; MGI: 2151113; GeneCards: OPTC

Gene location (Human)
Chr.	Chromosome 1 (human)
Band	1q32.1	Start	203,494,153 bp
Band	1q32.1	End	203,508,949 bp

Gene location (Mouse)
Chr.	Chromosome 1 (mouse)
Band	1 E4|1 58.02 cM	Start	133,824,937 bp
Band	1 E4|1 58.02 cM	End	133,835,737 bp
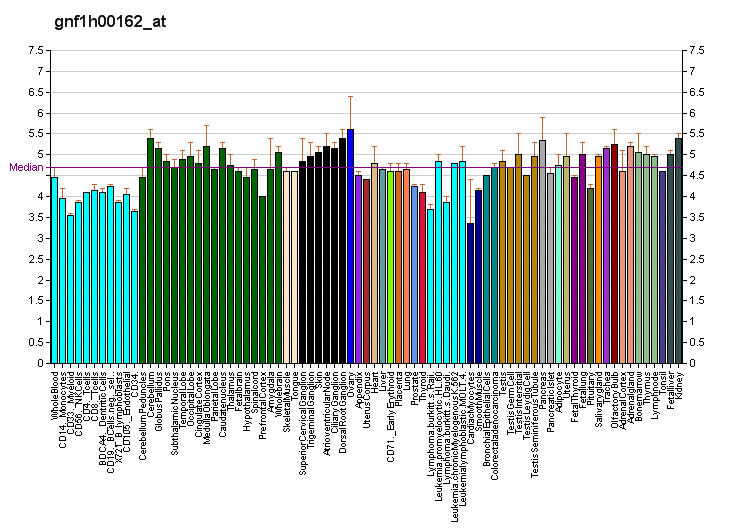
RNA expression pattern
Bgee	Human / Mouse (ortholog); Top expressed in: tibialis anterior muscle; mucosa of ileum; deltoid muscle; gonad; smooth muscle tissue; placenta; muscle layer of sigmoid colon; body of uterus; myometrium; left uterine tube / Top expressed in: ascending aorta; aortic valve; lens; epithelium of ciliary body; embryo; neural layer of retina; embryo; urinary bladder; iris; tunica media of zone of aorta; More reference expression data
BioGPS	More reference expression data
Gene ontology
Molecular function	extracellular matrix structural constituent
Cellular component	extracellular region; extracellular matrix
Biological process	extracellular matrix disassembly
Sources:Amigo / QuickGO
Orthologs
Databases	NCBI: entry; OMA: entry
Species	Human	Mouse
Entrez	26254	269120
Ensembl	ENSG00000188770	ENSMUSG00000010311
UniProt	Q9UBM4	Q920A0
RefSeq (mRNA)	NM_014359	NM_001160420; NM_001160421; NM_001160422; NM_054076; NM_001395557 NM_001395558
RefSeq (protein)	NP_055174	NP_001153892; NP_001153893; NP_001153894; NP_473417; NP_001382486 NP_001382487
Location (UCSC)	Chr 1: 203.49 – 203.51 Mb	Chr 1: 133.82 – 133.84 Mb
PubMed search
- Wikidata
View/Edit Human	View/Edit Mouse

Opticin is a protein that in humans is encoded by the OPTC gene.

Opticin belongs to class III of the small leucine-rich repeat protein (SLRP) family. Members of this family are typically associated with the extracellular matrix. Opticin is present in significant quantities in the vitreous of the eye and also localizes to the cornea, iris, ciliary body, optic nerve, choroid, retina, and fetal liver. Opticin may noncovalently bind collagen fibrils and regulate fibril morphology, spacing, and organization. The opticin gene is mapped to a region of chromosome 1 that is associated with the inherited eye diseases age-related macular degeneration (AMD) and posterior column ataxia with retinosa pigmentosa (AXPC1).
