= Vitreous body =

Clear gel within the eyeball, between the lens and retina

Vitreous humor
- The vitreous body lies at the back of the eye, between the lens and the retina.

Details
- Part of: Eye
- System: Visual system

Identifiers
- Latin: humor vitreus
- MeSH: D014822
- TA98: A15.2.06.014; A15.2.06.008
- TA2: 6809, 6814
- FMA: 58827 67388, 58827

In human anatomy, the vitreous body (from Latin vitreus 'glassy') is the clear gel that fills the space between the lens and the retina of the eye (the vitreous chamber) in humans and other vertebrates. It is often referred to as the vitreous humor (also spelled humour, from Latin meaning 'liquid'), or simply "the vitreous". Vitreous fluid or "liquid vitreous" is the liquid component of the vitreous gel, found after a vitreous detachment. It is not to be confused with the aqueous humor, the other fluid in the eye that is found between the cornea and lens.

== Structure ==
The vitreous humor is a transparent, colorless, gelatinous mass that fills the space in the eye between the lens and the retina. It is surrounded by a layer of collagen called the vitreous membrane (or hyaloid membrane or vitreous cortex) separating it from the rest of the eye. It makes up four-fifths of the volume of the eyeball. The vitreous body has an average volume of approximately 4 mL in the adult human eye; however, its volume varies significantly between individuals and depends on axial length and refractive status. Highly myopic eyes, which are characterized by increased axial length, may have vitreous volumes exceeding 9–10 mL, whereas hyperopic eyes with shorter axial length may have vitreous volumes of approximately 3–4 mL. The vitreous humour is fluid-like near the centre, and gel-like near the edges.

The vitreous humour is in contact with the vitreous membrane overlying the retina. Collagen fibrils attach the vitreous at the optic nerve disc and the ora serrata (where the retina ends anteriorly), at the Wieger-band, the dorsal side of the lens. The vitreous also firmly attaches to the lens capsule, retinal vessels, and the macula, the area of the retina which provides finer detail and central vision.

Aquaporin 4 in Müller cells in rats transports water to the vitreous body.

=== Anatomical features ===
The vitreous has many anatomical landmarks, including the hyaloid membrane, Berger's space, space of Erggelet, Wieger's ligament, Cloquet's canal and the space of Martegiani.

Surface features:

- Patella fossa: Shallow saucer-like concavity anteriorly, in which the lens rests, separated by Berger's space
- Ligamentum hyaloideocapsulare (Wieger's ligament): Circular thickening of vitreous 8–9mm in diameter, delineates the patella fossa
- Anterior hyaloid: Vitreous surface anterior to ora serrata. Continuous with and invests in the zonular fibres, and extends forward between the ciliary processes
- Vitreous base: Denser cortical area of vitreous. Firmly attached to the posterior 2mm of the pars plana, and the anterior 2–4mm of retina
- Posterior hyaloid surface: Closely applied to retinal internal limiting membrane. Firm attachment sites: Along blood vessels and at sites of retinal degeneration
- Space of Martegioni: A funnel shaped space overlying the optic disc with condensed edge
- Cloquet's canal: A 1–2 mm wide canal within the vitreous, from the space of Martegioni to the space of Berger, along an S-shaped course mainly below the horizontal. It is labelled "hyaloid canal" in the above diagram.
- Mittendorf's dot: A small circular opacity on the posterior lens capsule, which represents the site of attachment of the hyaloid artery before it subsequently regressed.
- Bergmeister's papilla: A tuft of fibrous tissue at the optic disc, which represents a remnant of the sheath associated with the hyaloid artery before it subsequently regressed.

Internal structures of the vitreous

- The vitreous body at birth is homogenous with a finely striated pattern.
- With early aging the vitreous develops narrow transvitreal "channels".
- The cortex is denser than the centre with development.
- From adolescence, vitreous tracts form from anterior to posterior.
- These vitreous tracts are fine sheet-like condensations of vitreous.

Named tracts

- Retrolental tract: Extends posteriorly from the hyaloideocapsular ligament into central vitreous
- Coronary tract: External to the retrolental tract, and excluding posteriorly from a circular zone overlying the posterior 1/3rd of the ciliary processes
- Median tract: Extends back from a circular zone external to the coronary tract, at the anterior margin of the vitreous base
- Preretinal tract: Extends back from the ora serrata and vitreous base

=== Biochemical properties ===
Its composition is similar to that of the cornea, but the vitreous contains very few cells. It is composed mostly of phagocytes, which remove unwanted cellular debris in the visual field, and hyalocytes, which turn over the hyaluronan.

The vitreous humour contains no blood vessels, and 98–99% of its volume is water. In addition to water, the vitreous consists of salts, sugars, vitrosin (a type of collagen), a network of collagen type II fibrils with glycosaminoglycan, hyaluronan, opticin, and a wide array of proteins. Despite having little solid matter, the fluid is substantial enough to fill the eye and give it its spherical shape. This contrasts with the aqueous humour, which is more fluid, and the lens, on the other hand, which is elastic in nature and is tightly packed with cells. The vitreous humour has a viscosity two to four times that of water, giving it a gelatinous consistency. It has a refractive index of 1.336.

Inorganic ion content of vitreous body

Inorganic ion content of vitreous
Solute	Mean concentration	Units	Reference	Data from living humans?
Sodium	146.7	mmol/L		Yes
Potassium	5.73	mmol/L		Yes
Chloride	121.6	mmol/L		Yes
Calcium	1.13	mmol/L		Yes
Magnesium	0.9	mmol/L		Yes
Phosphate	0.1 to 3.3	mEq/dm^{3}		No
Bicarbonate	1.2 to 3.0	g/kg water		No

Inorganic coenzyme content of vitreous
Solute	Mean concentration	Units	Reference	Data from living humans?
Copper	0.52	μmol/L		Yes
Selenium	0.104	μmol/L		Yes
Iron	3.11	μmol/L		Yes
Manganese	110.7	nmol/L		Yes

Organic content of vitreous body

Organic content of vitreous
Solute	Mean concentration	Units	Reference	Data from living humans?
Glucose	2.97	mmol/L		Yes
Lactate	3.97	mmol/L		Yes
Lipids	2	μg/mL		No
Total protein content	280–1360	μg/cm^{3}		No
Hyaluronan	42–400	μg/cm^{3}		No
Versican	60	μg/cm^{3}		No
Collagen	300	μg/mL		No
Albumin	293 ± 18	μg/cm^{3}		No
Immunoglobulin (IgG)	33.5 ± 3	μg/cm^{3}		No
α1-Antitrypsin	141 ± 2.9	μg/cm^{3}		No
α1-Acid glycoprotein	4 ± 0.7	μg/cm^{3}		No
Beta-hydroxybutyrate	0.094	mmol/L		Yes
Ferritin	19.52	μg/L		Yes
Transferrin	0.088	g/L		Yes
Urea	24–172	mg/dL water		No
Creatinine	0.3–3.0	mg/dL water		No
Citrate	1.9	mg/dL water		No
Pyruvic acid	7.3	mg/dL water		No
Ascorbic acid	36	mg/100g		No

Physical properties of the vitreous body

Physical properties of vitreous
Property	Value	Units	Reference	Data from living humans?
Volume	3.9	mL		No
Weight	3.9	g		No
Water content	99 to 99.7	%		No
pH	7.4 to 7.52			No
Osmolality	289.5	mOsm/kg		Yes
Osmotic pressure (Freezing-point depression)	-0.554 to -0.518	°C		No
Density	1.0053 to 1.0089	g/cm^{3}		No
Intrinsic viscosity	3–5 × 10^{3}	cm^{3}/g		No
Dynamic viscosity	1.6	cP		No
Refractive index	1.3345 to 1.337			No

== Development ==
The vitreous fluid is not present at birth (the eye being filled with only the gel-like vitreous body), but found after age 4–5, and increases in size thereafter.

Produced by cells in the non-pigmented portion of the ciliary body, the vitreous humour is derived from embryonic mesenchyme cells, which degenerate after birth.

The nature and composition of the vitreous humour changes over the course of life. In adolescence, the vitreous cortex becomes more dense and vitreous tracts develop; and in adulthood, the tracts become better defined and sinuous. Central vitreous liquefies, fibrillar degeneration occurs, and the tracts break up (syneresis).

Coarse strands develop with ageing. The gel volume decreases with age, and the liquid volume increases. The cortex may disappear at sites, allowing liquid vitreous to extrude adjacently into the potential space between vitreous cortex and retina (vitreous detachment).

== Clinical significance ==
=== Injury ===
If the vitreous pulls away from the retina, it is known as a vitreous detachment. As the human body ages, the vitreous often liquefies and may collapse. This is more likely to occur, and occurs much earlier, in eyes that are nearsighted (myopia). It can also occur after injuries to the eye or inflammation in the eye (uveitis).

The collagen fibres of the vitreous are held apart by electrical charges. With aging, these charges tend to reduce, and the fibres may clump together. Similarly, the gel may liquefy, a condition known as synaeresis, allowing cells and other organic clusters to float freely within the vitreous humour. These allow floaters which are perceived in the visual field as spots or fibrous strands. Floaters are generally harmless, but the sudden onset of recurring floaters may signify a posterior vitreous detachment or other diseases of the eye.

Posterior vitreous detachment: Once liquid vitreous enters the sub-hyaloid space between the vitreous cortex and the retina, it may strip the vitreous cortex off the retina with each eye movement (see Saccade).

=== Postmortem and forensic ===
After death, the vitreous resists putrefaction longer than other body fluids. Within the hours, days and weeks after death, the vitreous potassium concentration rises, at such a predictable speed that vitreous potassium levels are frequently used to estimate the time since death (post-mortem interval) of a corpse.

The metabolic exchange and equilibration between systemic circulation and vitreous humour is so slow that vitreous humour is sometimes the fluid of choice for postmortem analysis of glucose levels or substances which would be more rapidly diffused, degraded, excreted or metabolized from general circulation.

According to Judaism, extracting the vitreous fluid for forensic chemical analysis is preferred to blood analysis (in case a forensic or post-mortem toxicology test is deemed necessary). This avoids the loss of even a few droplets of blood from the body prior to burial.

== Additional images ==
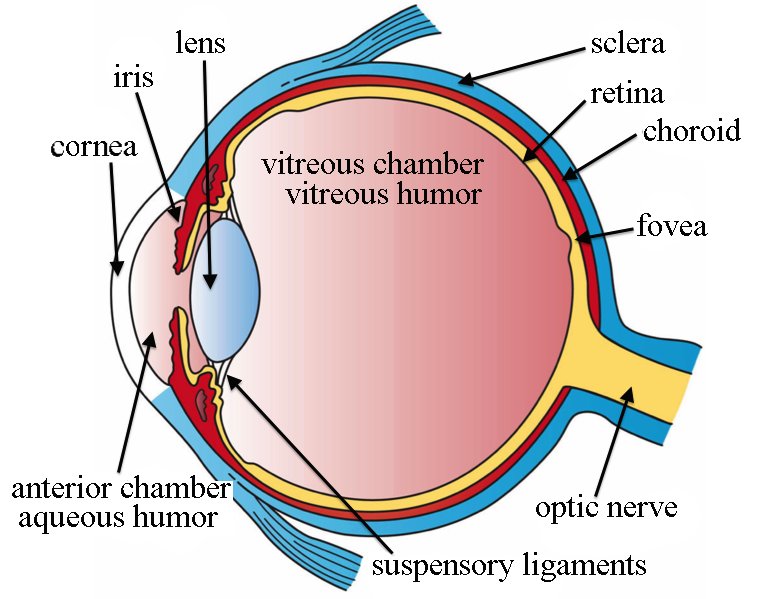
Structures of the eye labeled

This image shows another labeled view of the structures of the eye.

== See also ==
- Anterior chamber of eyeball
- Eye floaters
