= Lattice degeneration =

- This condition is inherited in an autosomal dominant manner.
- Specialty: Ophthalmology
- Symptoms: Lattice degeneration itself does not cause symptoms
- Diagnostic method: Dilated fundus examination

Lattice degeneration is a disease of the human eye wherein the peripheral retina becomes atrophic in a lattice pattern. Usually, this happens slowly over time and does not cause any symptoms, and medical intervention is neither needed nor recommended.

Sometimes other retinal problems (such as tears, breaks, or holes) may be present along with lattice degeneration. However, these problems may also be distinct from or independent of lattice degeneration itself.

The cause of lattice degeneration is unknown, but pathology reveals inadequate blood flow resulting in ischemia and fibrosis. The condition is common in those with myopia (nearsightedness).

== Prevention ==
There are no preventative techniques for lattice degeneration.

== Treatment ==
There is no treatment for lattice degeneration.

If lattice degeneration is present around the setting of other, more serious problems such as retinal tears, holes, the risk of retinal detachment may be higher, so preventative treatments may be recommended to strengthen the retina.

Barrage laser is at times done prophylactically around a hole or tear associated with lattice degeneration in an eye at risk of developing a retinal detachment. It is not known if surgical interventions such as laser photocoagulation or cryotherapy are effective in preventing retinal detachment in patients with lattice degeneration or asymptomatic retinal breaks. Laser photocoagulation has been shown to reduce risks of retinal detachment in symptomatic lattice degeneration. There are documented cases wherein retina detached from areas which were otherwise healthy despite being treated previously with laser.

== Prognosis ==
In the overwhelming majority of cases, lattice degeneration has no effect on quality of life.

== Prevalence ==
Lattice degeneration is associated with retinal detachment, but the chance of developing retinal detachment if lattice degeneration exists is very low.

Lattice degeneration occurs in approximately 6–8% of the general population and in approximately 30% of phakic retinal detachments. Similar lesions are seen in patients with Ehlers–Danlos syndrome, Marfan syndrome, and Stickler syndrome, all of which are associated with an increased risk of retinal detachment. Risk of developing lattice degeneration in one eye is also increased if lattice degeneration is already present in the other eye.

Lattice degeneration is often an incidental finding during a regular eye exam. The American Academy of Ophthalmology notes though retinal detachment is associated with lattice degeneration, lattice degeneration is not as strongly associated with or predictive of retinal detachment, with one study finding a low overall risk of developing retinal detachment at around 0.3–0.5%.
