= Synchysis scintillans =

- Human eye (vitreous humor in the middle)
- Specialty: Ophthalmology

Synchysis scintillans, also known as cholesterolosis bulbi, is a rare degenerative condition of the eye characterized by the accumulation of cholesterol crystals within the vitreous cavity. These crystals are characterized by freely mobile, highly refractile, multicolored particles that move with eye movements and settle inferiorly under gravity. This gives it a characteristic "snow-globe" effect on exam.

This condition is commonly associated with advanced ocular disease, but it has also been reported as an incidental finding in normal aging eyes. While historically described in younger population and affecting eyes bilaterally, it has also been reported to suggest it can occur across a wide age range and commonly affecting the eye unilaterally.

Synchysis scintillans is often asymptomatic and identified incidentally during examination. Diagnosis is clinical, based on distinct appearance, but histological analysis can confirm birefringent cholesterol crystals.

== History ==
The earliest known description of synchysis scintillans was recorded in 1828 by French ophthalmologist Jean-Francois Parfait-Landrau. He described the condition as brilliant gold-colored powder-like particles within the vitreous humor of the posterior chamber of the human eye.

In 1831, german-austrian ophthalmologist Johann Adam Schmidt found that these particles could migrate towards the anterior chamber of the eye, noting a "shower of silver- and gold dust" released when he opened the anterior chamber of a blind eye.

Several cases and research of synchysis scintillans had been made since then, found both in posterior chamber and anterior chamber of the eye. It had long been postulated that the particles were made of cholesterol crystals, given its resemblance under light microscopy. In 1963, Kumar determined that these crystals were composed of cholesterol through chemical analysis.

== Epidemiology ==
Epidemiologic studies on synchysis scintillans are limited, and the condition is considered rare. It is estimated to have a prevalence of approximately 0.003% and affects men and women equally.

Historically, synchysis scintillans has been described as occurring in relatively younger adults, most commonly reported in the third decade of life, and typically affecting both eyes, with unilateral disease considered uncommon. However, more recent case reports and clinical series have demonstrated that the condition may also occur in older adults, particularly in the seventh decade of life, and that unilateral involvement may be more common than previously thought. Reported cases have occurred across a wide age range, with the youngest reported patient at approximately 1.5 years of age and the oldest at 83 years.

Synchysis scintillans has historically been associated with severely damaged or chronically diseased eyes. It has been linked most frequently to long-standing vitreous hemorrhage and chronic retinal detachment. Additional reported associations include the following:

- ocular trauma
- chronic intraocular inflammation
- hyphema
- secondary glaucoma

The condition has also been reported in association with several retinal or intraocular diseases, including:

- Coats disease
- Eales disease
- Retinoblastoma
- retinal vascular disorders, such as retinal capillary hemangioma.

Although classically described in diseased eyes, synchysis scintillans has also been reported as an incidental finding in eyes without severe ocular pathology. It has been reported to occur in patients with no or only mild ocular disease, and associations with conditions such as cataract were noted. These observations have led some authors to suggest that synchysis scintillans may occasionally represent a degenerative change related to aging of the vitreous rather than exclusively a consequence of severe ocular damage.

== Pathophysiology ==
The pathophysiology of synchysis scintillans is not completely understood, but several mechanisms have been proposed.

One widely accepted proposed mechanism involves the breakdown of intraocular red blood cell products. The lipid rich-cell membrane releases intraocular cholesterol during degradation, creating a lipid-rich environment that favors cholesterol crystallization. This mechanism is thought to occur in chronic vitreous hemorrhages or hyphemas. Repeated hemorrhages, impaired vitreous blood absroption, or retinal neovasculrization may further promote crystal formation.

Cholesterol crystals can also arise independently of hemorrhage in the setting of degenerative ocular conditions. Chronic retinal detachment is an implicated source of crystals. The lipid-rich subretinal fluid may pass through retinal defects or degenerative retinal tissue into the vitreous cavity, where cholesterol then crystallizes.

Changes in the ocular barrier systems and intraocular fluid composition may contribute to crystal formation. Trauma, inflammation, or degenerative disease can disrupt the blood-aqueous of blood-retinal barriers, allowing cholesterol, serum lipids, and red blood cells to enter intraocular structures. This facilitates a lipid rich environment and subsequent crystal formation. Degenerative vitreous changes may impair the ability to maintain normal levels of cholesterol within the intraocular vitreous solution, allowing precipitation of crystals. Fluid composition can also be compromised in the setting of a blood absorption insufficiency.

Biochemical changes within the vitreous fluid may play a role in crystal formation. Vitreous fluid analysis from affected eyes showed evidence of oxidative stress and lipoperoxidation. The vitreous environment had reduced antioxidant enzyme activity and increased oxidative lipid by-products. Lipid oxidative damage may contribute to cholesterol crystalization.

Although synchysis scintillans primarily involves the vitreous cavity, cholesterol crystals have been rarely reported in the anterior chamber. Several mechanisms have been proposed. Crystals may form in situ following anterior chamber hemorrhage or hyphema, but more commonly form in the posterior segment and then migrate anteriorly. Structural changes that facilitate this migration include aphakia, pseudophakia, lens subluxation or luxation, zonular degeneration, or iris atrophy that create abnormal communication between ocular structures.

== Diagnosis ==
Synchysis scintillans is usually a clinical diagnosis and based on its characteristic ophthalmic findings. Slit-lamp or fundoscopic examination is used for visualization. On examination, the affected eye will reveal refractive multicolored crystals, larger than other intraocular particulate matter. The crystals freely move in suspension within the vitreous cavity and settle inferiorly under gravity at rest, creating a snow-globe effect.

A definitive diagnosis can be made through histology, which will demonstrate birefringent cholesterol crystals under polarized light and positive staining with lipid-specific stains.

The main differential diagnosis is asteroid hyalosis, another degenerative vitreous condition. Where as synchysis scintillans crystals are composed of cholesterol, asteroid hyalosis is composed of calcium-lipid deposits. Asteroid hyalosis is typically seen in older adults and usually not associated with significant underlying ocular disease. Asteroid hyalosis ophthalmic findings reveal particulate matter suspended within the vitreous gel, moving with it and returning to their original position. Cholesterol crystals in synchysis scintillans, however, move freely and settle with gravity.
