= Vitreous membrane =

Membrane within the eyeball surrounding the vitreous humor

- Schematic diagram of the human eye. Vitreous membrane is not labeled but it surrounds the vitreous, the dark mauve/purple area labeled 'Vitreous Humour'.

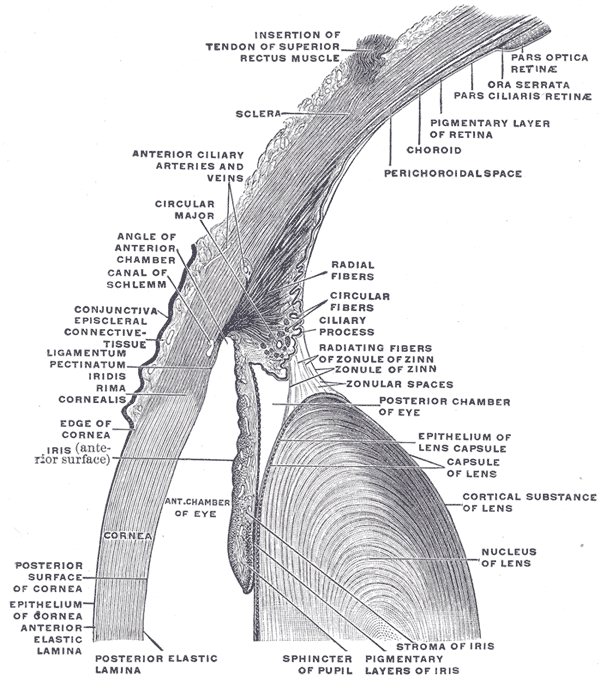
- The upper half of a sagittal section through the front of the eyeball. Vitreous membrane is not labeled but is visible.

Details

Identifiers
- Latin: membrana vitrea
- TA98: A15.2.06.012
- TA2: 6813

In human anatomy, the vitreous membrane (also called the vitreous cortex or hyaloid membrane) is a layer of collagen separating the vitreous humour from the rest of the eye. At least two parts have been identified anatomically:

- The posterior hyaloid membrane separates the rear of the vitreous from the retina. It is a false anatomical membrane.
- The anterior hyaloid membrane separates the front of the vitreous from the lens.

Bernal et al. describe it as:

A delicate structure in the form of a thin layer that runs from the pars plana to the posterior lens, where it shares its attachment with the posterior zonule via Weigert's ligament, also known as Egger's line.
