= Polypoidal choroidal vasculopathy =

Eye disease affecting the choroid

- Specialty: Ophthalmology
- Symptoms: Blurring of vision, scotoma
- Complications: Irreversible vision loss in the central field of vision
- Types: Quiescent or Active
- Risk factors: Smoking
- Diagnostic method: fundus examination, Indocyanine green angiography, Fluorescein angiography or Optical coherence tomography
- Treatment: observation, photodynamic therapy, thermal laser, anti-VEGF therapy or combination therapy

Polypoidal choroidal vasculopathy (PCV) is an eye disease primarily affecting the choroid. It may cause sudden blurring of vision or a scotoma in the central field of vision. Since Indocyanine green angiography gives better imaging of choroidal structures, it is more preferred in diagnosing PCV. Treatment options of PCV include careful observation, photodynamic therapy, thermal laser, intravitreal injection of anti-VEGF therapy, or combination therapy.

== Signs and symptoms ==
In PCV, sudden blurring of vision or a scotoma in the central field of vision may occur in one or both eyes. Another symptom is metamorphopsia. Signs include polypoidal lesions, orange-red lesions in fundus, subretinal fluid, retinal detachment, subretinal hemorrhages, subretinal fibrinous material, hard exudates and drusen.

=== Complications ===
Irreversible vision loss in the central field of vision is a complication of PCV. It may also cause choroidal ischemia, inflammation and breaks in Bruch's membrane.

== Etiology ==
PCV is believed to occur due to abnormalities in the inner choroidal vessels. Since it shares many similarities with age-related macular degeneration (AMD), it was previously considered as a subtype of AMD, but later studies shown that PCV may be a variant of type 1 neovascularization of any origin.

== Pathophysiology ==
PCV is an ocular disease characterised by abnormally shaped vessels in the choroid. It is described as an exudative maculopathy, characterised by multiple recurrent serosanguineous retinal pigment epithelial detachments. Elevated reddish to orange lesions on fundus examination, dilated inner choroidal vessels, and polypoidal vascular structures beneath the retinal detachment are other features of PCV.

== Diagnosis ==
PCV may be diagnosed during a routine dilated fundus examination by an ophthalmologist. Fluorescein angiography, Indocyanine green angiography and Optical coherence tomography is also used to diagnose PCV. Since it gives better imaging of choroidal structures, ICGA is more preferred.

=== Classification ===
If there is presence of polyps without clinical signs of subretinal detachment or hemorrhage, it is classified as Quiescent. It is classified as Active, if there is subretinal or intraretinal fluid, pigment epithelial detachment, subretinal hemorrhage, or fluorescein leakage. Active lesions are further classified as Exudative, Hemorrhagic or Mixed forms.

== Treatment ==
Treatment options of PCV include careful observation, photodynamic therapy, Thermal laser, intravitreal injection of anti-VEGF therapy, or combination therapy.

== Epidemiology ==
PCV is commonly seen in patients of age 60-72 years, and can affect both sexes. Prevalence is more in Asian and African descent than Caucasians. PCV is commonly seen in males in Asian population and females in Caucasian population. In Chinese and Japanese population, prevalence rates in patients with presumed AMD is approximately 24.5%-54.7%, 49% in the Taiwanese population and 24.6% in the Korean population, while in Caucasian patients with presumed AMD, prevalence rate is only 4% - 9.8%.

== History ==
Lawrence Yannuzzi first described the Polypoidal choroidal vasculopathy in 1982.
