= Pars plana =

Part of the eye's ciliary body

In human anatomy, the pars plana (from Latin 'flat portion'; also known as orbicularis ciliaris) is part of the ciliary body in the uvea (or vascular tunic, the middle layer of the three layers that comprise the eye).

It is about 4 mm long, located near the junction of the iris and sclera, and is scalloped in appearance.

The pars plana may not have a function in the post-fetal period, making this a good site of entry for ophthalmic surgery of the posterior segment of eyeball; this surgery is known as pars plana vitrectomy.
