= Ora serrata =

Where rod and cone of the eye terminate

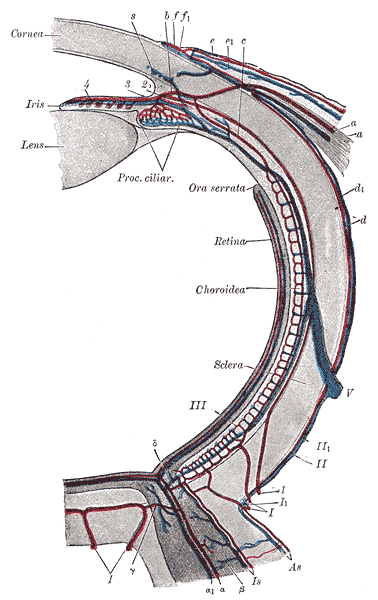
- Diagram of the blood vessels of the eye, as seen in a horizontal section.

Identifiers
- TA98: A15.2.04.006
- TA2: 6780
- FMA: 58600

The ora serrata is the serrated junction between the choroid and the ciliary body. This junction marks the transition from the simple, non-photosensitive area of the ciliary body to the complex, multi-layered, photosensitive region of the retina. The pigmented layer is continuous over choroid, ciliary body and iris while the nervous layer terminates just before the ciliary body. This point is the ora serrata. In this region the pigmented epithelium of the retina transitions into the outer pigmented epithelium of the ciliary body and the inner portion of the retina transitions into the non-pigmented epithelium of the cilia. In animals in which the region does not have a serrated appearance, it is called the ora ciliaris retinae.

== Additional images ==
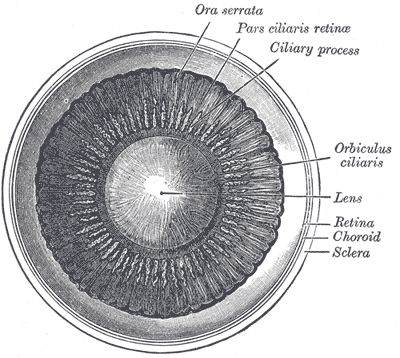
Interior of anterior half of bulb of eye.

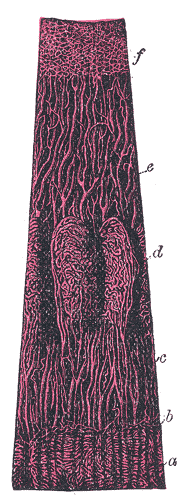
Vessels of the choroid, ciliary processes, and iris of a child.

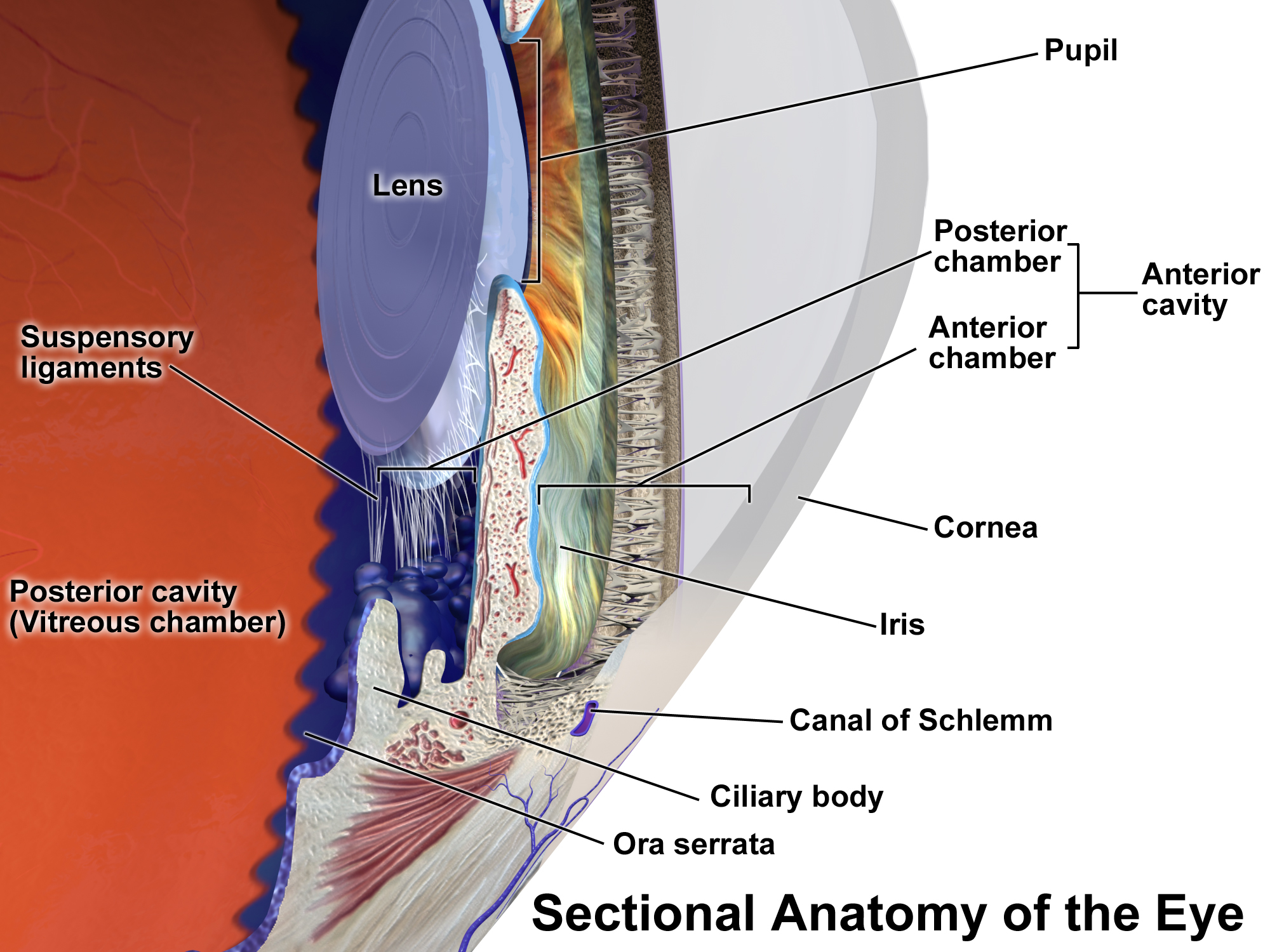
Partial section of the human eye

== See also ==
- Human eye
