= Retinal pigment epithelium =

Layer of cells in the eye

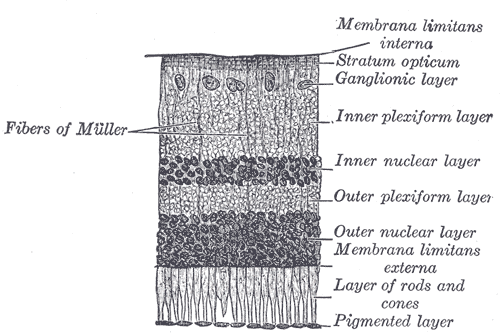
- Section of retina. (Pigmented layer labeled at bottom right.)

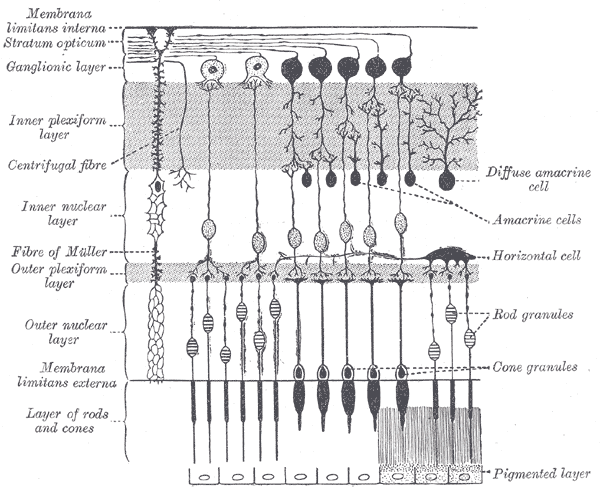
- Plan of retinal neurons. (Pigmented layer labeled at bottom right.)

Details

Identifiers
- Latin: stratum pigmentosum retinae, pars pigmentosa retinae
- MeSH: D055213
- TA98: A15.2.04.008
- TA2: 6782
- FMA: 58627

The pigmented layer of retina or retinal pigment epithelium (RPE) is the pigmented cell layer just outside the neurosensory retina that nourishes retinal visual cells, and is firmly attached to the underlying choroid and overlying retinal visual cells.

== History ==
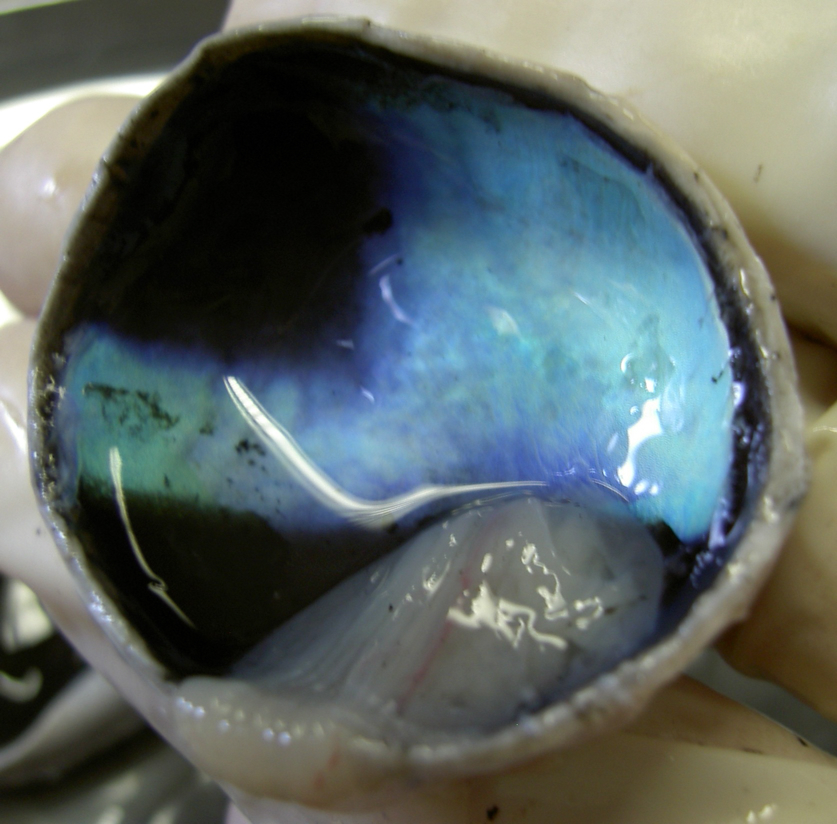
Choroid dissected from a calf's eye, showing black RPE and iridescent blue tapetum lucidum

The RPE was referred to in the 18th and 19th centuries as the pigmentum nigrum, reflecting the observation that the RPE is dark (black in many animals, brown in humans); and as the tapetum nigrum, referring to the observation that in animals with a tapetum lucidum, in the region of the tapetum lucidum the RPE is not pigmented.

== Anatomy ==
The RPE is composed of a single layer of hexagonal cells that are densely packed with pigment granules.

When viewed from the outer surface, these cells are smooth and hexagonal in shape. When seen in section, each cell consists of an outer non-pigmented part containing a large oval nucleus and an inner pigmented portion which extends as a series of straight thread-like processes between the rods, this being especially the case when the eye is exposed to light.

The size and morphology of RPE cells vary with both anatomical location and age. From the central macula (~12–18 μm in height and ~10 μm in width) toward the peripheral retina, the cells gradually become broader, flatter, and more heterogeneous in shape. Ageing is associated with a reduction in RPE cell number, particularly in central regions. Local cell loss may be partially compensated by the lateral migration of adjacent cells, with remaining cells expanding or elongating to cover the affected areas.

=== Development ===
The RPE co-differentiates from the neural retina and both layers can mutually affect the other’s development, as in gene mutations in a layer that more severely affects the opposite layer than itself. The visual cycle starts running before the neural retina is developed. The RPE sits between the neural retina and the choroid (which is buffered by a matrix called Bruch’s membrane.

== Function ==
The RPE has several functions, namely, light absorption, epithelial transport, spatial ion buffering, visual cycle, phagocytosis, secretion and immune modulation.

1. Light absorption: RPE are responsible for absorbing scattered light. This role is very important for two main reasons, first, to improve the quality of the optical system, second, light is radiation, and it is concentrated by a lens onto the cells of the macula, resulting in a strong concentration of photo-oxidative energy. Furthermore, free radicals from phagosome breakdown may contribute to this stress. Melanosomes absorb the scattered light and thus diminish the photo-oxidative stress. The high perfusion of retina brings a high oxygen tension environment. The combination of light and oxygen brings oxidative stress, and RPE has many mechanisms to cope with it, including antioxidants. However, a byproduct called lipofuscin may cause cell deterioration, which could eventually lead to age-related macular degeneration (AMD).
2. Epithelial transport: As mentioned above, RPE compose the outer blood–retinal barrier, the epithelia has tight junctions between the lateral surfaces and implies an isolation of the inner retina from the systemic influences. This is important for the immune privilege (not only as barrier, but with signaling process as well) of eyes, a highly selective transport of substances for a tightly controlled environment. RPE supply nutrients to photoreceptors, control ion homeostasis and eliminate water and metabolites.
3. Spatial buffering of ions: Changes in the subretinal space are fast and require a capacitative compensation by RPE. Many cells are involved in transduction of light and if they are not compensated for, they are no longer excitable and proper transduction would not be possible. The normal transepithelial transport of ions would be too slow to compensate quickly enough for these changes, there are many underlying mechanisms based on the activity of voltage-dependent ion channels add to the basic transepithelial transport of ions.
4. Visual cycle: The visual cycle fulfills an essential task of maintaining visual function and needs therefore to be adapted to different visual needs such as vision in darkness or lightness. For this, functional aspects come into play: the storage of retinal and the adaption of the reaction speed. Basically, vision at low light intensities requires a lower turn-over rate of the visual cycle, whereas in well-lit conditions the turn-over rate is much higher. In the sudden transition from darkness to light, a large amount of 11-cis retinal is required. This comes not directly from the visual cycle but from several retinal pools of retinal binding proteins which are connected to each other by the transportation and reaction steps of the visual cycle.
5. Phagocytosis of photoreceptor outer segment (POS) membranes: POS are exposed to constant photo-oxidative stress, and they go through constant destruction by it. They are constantly renewed by shedding their end, which RPE then phagocytoses and digests.
6. Secretion: The RPE is an epithelium which closely interacts with photoreceptors on one side but must also be able to interact with cells on the blood side of the epithelium, such as endothelial cells or cells of the immune system. In order to communicate with the neighboring tissues the RPE is able to secrete a large variety of factors and signaling molecules. It secretes ATP, fas-ligand (fas-L), fibroblast growth factors (FGF-1, FGF-2, and FGF-5), transforming growth factor-β (TGF-β), insulin-like growth factor-1 (IGF-1), ciliary neurotrophic factor (CNTF), platelet-derived growth factor (PDGF), vascular endothelial growth factor (VEGF), lens epithelium-derived growth factor (LEDGF), members of the interleukin family, tissue inhibitor of matrix metalloproteinase (TIMP) and pigment epithelium-derived factor (PEDF). Many of these signaling molecules have important physiopathologic roles.
7. Immune privilege of the eye: The inner eye represents an immune privileged space which is disconnected from the immune system of the blood stream. The immune privilege is supported by the RPE in two ways. First, it represents a mechanical and tight barrier which separates the inner space of the eye from the blood stream. Second, the RPE is able to communicate with the immune system in order to silence immune reaction in the healthy eye or, on the other hand, to activate the immune system in the case of disease.

== Pathology ==
In the eyes of albinos, the cells of this layer contain no pigment. Dysfunction of the RPE is found in age-related macular degeneration and retinitis pigmentosa. RPE are also involved in diabetic retinopathy. Gardner syndrome is characterized by FAP (familial adenomatous polyps), osseous and soft tissue tumors, retinal pigment epithelium hypertrophy and impacted teeth.

== RPE Cell Culture ==
A confluent monolayer of RPE cell culture resembles a mosaic or cobblestone pattern. At the individual cell level, the morphology is typically described as polygonal or hexagonal, columnar, or epithelioid. In electron micrographs, cells with apical surface microvilli (scanning electron microscopy) exhibit distinct structural features, including apical microvilli, basal infoldings, melanin pigments, tight junctions between cells, and various organelles (transmission electron microscopy).

The use of RPE–choroid organ cultures dates back to the 1920s, developing alongside early cell culture methods and later evolving from static to perfusion systems. Despite mimicking in vivo conditions, these explants are limited by postmortem time and tissue preservation. RPE cultures were first established from embryonic chick tissue in the 1920s, then expanded to amphibians and other animals, with significant progress achieved in the 1960s through improved media such as Eagle's medium. Since the 1970s, human RPE cultures, both fetal and adult, have been widely used, though ethical and donor-related constraints have driven the use of pluripotent stem cell-derived RPE (iPSC-RPE) as a renewable alternative. Non-human sources, such as adult porcine RPE, are also employed despite species-specific differences like the absence of a macula. In addition to primary cells, immortalized RPE cell lines emerged in the 1970s, with ARPE-19 and D407 among the first human lines, and remain central to current research alongside newer human and animal-derived lines.

Methods for culturing RPE have been refined continuously since their introduction in the 1920s. While multiple culture parameters have been considered, oxygen tension within the RPE microenvironment has received little attention. Because oxygen is a key determinant of cellular behavior, deviations from the physiological range for RPE cells (approximately 70–90 mm Hg) may significantly alter experimental outcomes. This issue was first highlighted in 2022, when unregulated oxygen in RPE cultures was described in the literature by Mazyar Yazdani (Oslo University Hospital).

== See also ==
- Bruch's membrane
- Drusen
- Fovea centralis
- Fundus (eye)
- Macula of retina
