= Cloquet =

Cloquet can refer to:

== People ==
- Ghislain Cloquet, Belgian-born French cinematographer
- Hippolyte Cloquet, French physician and anatomist
- Jules Germain Cloquet, French physician and surgeon

== Other ==
- Cloquet, Minnesota, a city
- Cloquet River, Minnesota, United States
- 1918 Cloquet Fire, a massive fire in northern Minnesota in October, 1918
- Cloquet Terminal Railroad, a small terminal railroad
- Cloquet Valley State Forest, Minnesota
- Cloquet's canal, see Hyaloid artery
- Cloquet's node, a lymph node
