= Central vein =

Central vein can refer to:

- Central veins of liver
- Central retinal vein
- Central vein of suprarenal gland

Also:

- Kuhnt's postcentral vein
