= Ernest Cloquet =

Physician in Qajar Iran of French origin

Louis André Ernest Cloquet
- Born: October 11, 1818; Paris, France
- Died: 1855; Tehran, Iran
- Resting place: Doulab Cemetery, Tehran
- Occupation: Physician

Louis André Ernest Cloquet (born 11 October 1818, Paris; died 1855, Tehran) was a medical doctor in Qajar Iran of French origin during the reigns of Mohammad Shah Qajar (1834–1848) and Naser al-Din Shah Qajar (1848–1896). He also served as the French minister to the court at Tehran from 1846 to 1855.

== Biography ==
Cloquet the son of the noted French anatomist Hippolyte Cloquet, and he also chose to become an anatomist. He was the nephew of another noted French physician, Jules Germain Cloquet. From 1840 Ernest worked at various clinical offices in Paris, and was a regular contributor to the Société anatomique. In 1846, with his thesis named De l’hématocèle vaginale, he was awarded his doctors degree in medicine, and later that year he was attached to the French mission in Tehran. He was appointed ambassador to the court and became the personal physician of the king (shah), succeeding another Frenchman named Dr. Labat. His regular attendance during the last illness of the then incumbent King Mohammad Shah Qajar earned him a good professional reputation. Not long after Naser al-Din Shah Qajar's ascension to the throne, Cloquet was officially re-confirmed by the King in his functions. He was also appointed as an instructor in the newly founded Dār al-Fonūn University.

Following a failed attempt on the King's life in 1852 by followers of the Báb, Cloquet treated him and removed a bullet from one of his wounds. When subsequently many followers of the Bab were arrested and executed, high-ranking officials at the king's court were formally invited to show their loyalty by personally participating in the executions; Cloquet did not participate, stating that it would violate his Hippocratic oath.

He carried out a programme of research on cholera. Cloquet himself witnessed two outbreaks – in 1846 and 1853. He made observations regarding the sanitary conditions of the nation as well as its climate. For his contribution to French diplomacy in Persia he received an officer's cross of the légion d’honneur. An anecdote is told of when in 1855 his native assistant mistakenly poured him a glass of tincture of cantharides (also known as Spanish fly) instead of brandy; when Cloquet realized what had happened, he drank another glass after it in order to reduce the length of his suffering. Cloquet was succeeded as the king's personal physician by Jakob Eduard Polak in 1856.

== See also ==
- France–Iran relations

== Sources ==
- Fisher, William Bayne; Avery, P.; Hambly, G. R. G; Melville, C. (1991). The Cambridge History of Iran. Vol. 7. Cambridge: Cambridge University Press. ISBN 0521200954.
- Gurney, John; Nabavi, Negin (1993). "DĀR AL-FONŪN". Encyclopaedia Iranica, Vol. VI, Fasc. 6. pp. 662–668.
- Richter-Bernburg, Lutz (1992). "CLOQUET, LOUIS-ANDRÉ-ERNEST". Encyclopaedia Iranica, Vol. V, Fasc. 7. p. 718.
