= Bergmeister's papilla =

Congenital malformation of optic disc

Bergmeister's papilla arises from the centre of the optic disc, consists of a small tuft of fibrous tissue and represents a remnant of the fetal hyaloid artery.

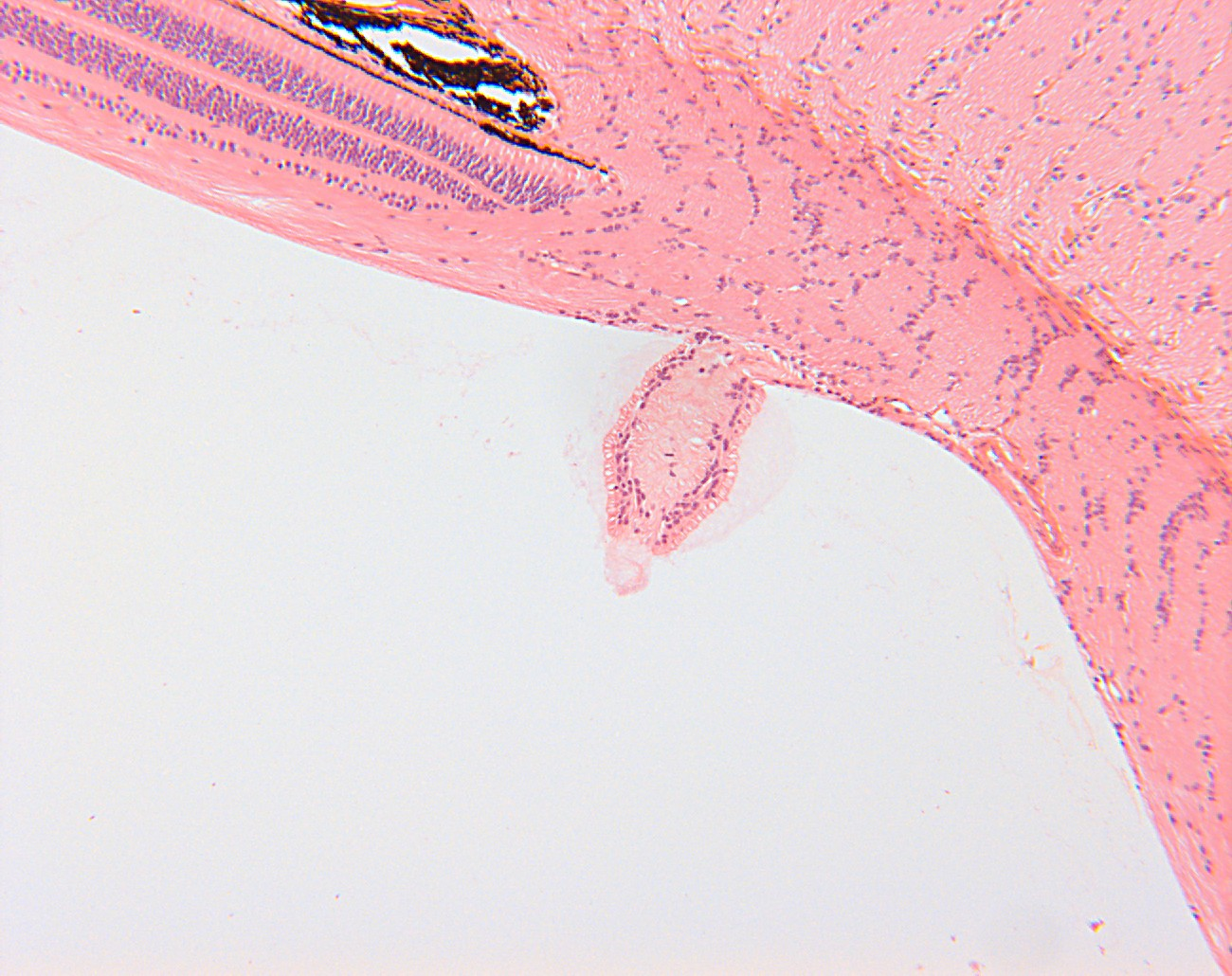
Bergmeister's papilla, histological section.

The hyaloid artery provides nutrition to the lens during development in the fetus, and runs forward to the lens from the optic disc. The optic disc is covered by a plaque of fibrous cells called the central supporting tissue meniscus of Kuhnt. This plaque forms a fibrous sheath around the hyaloid artery where it leaves the optic disc. At birth the hyaloid artery regresses, and is normally completely regressed by the time of eyelid opening. Bergmeister's papilla is a remnant of the hyaloid artery fibrous sheath and is frequently observed as an incidental clinical finding. Bergmeister's papilla is named after Austrian ophthalmologist O. Bergmeister (1845–1918).
