= Jules Germain Cloquet =

French physician and surgeon (1790–1883)

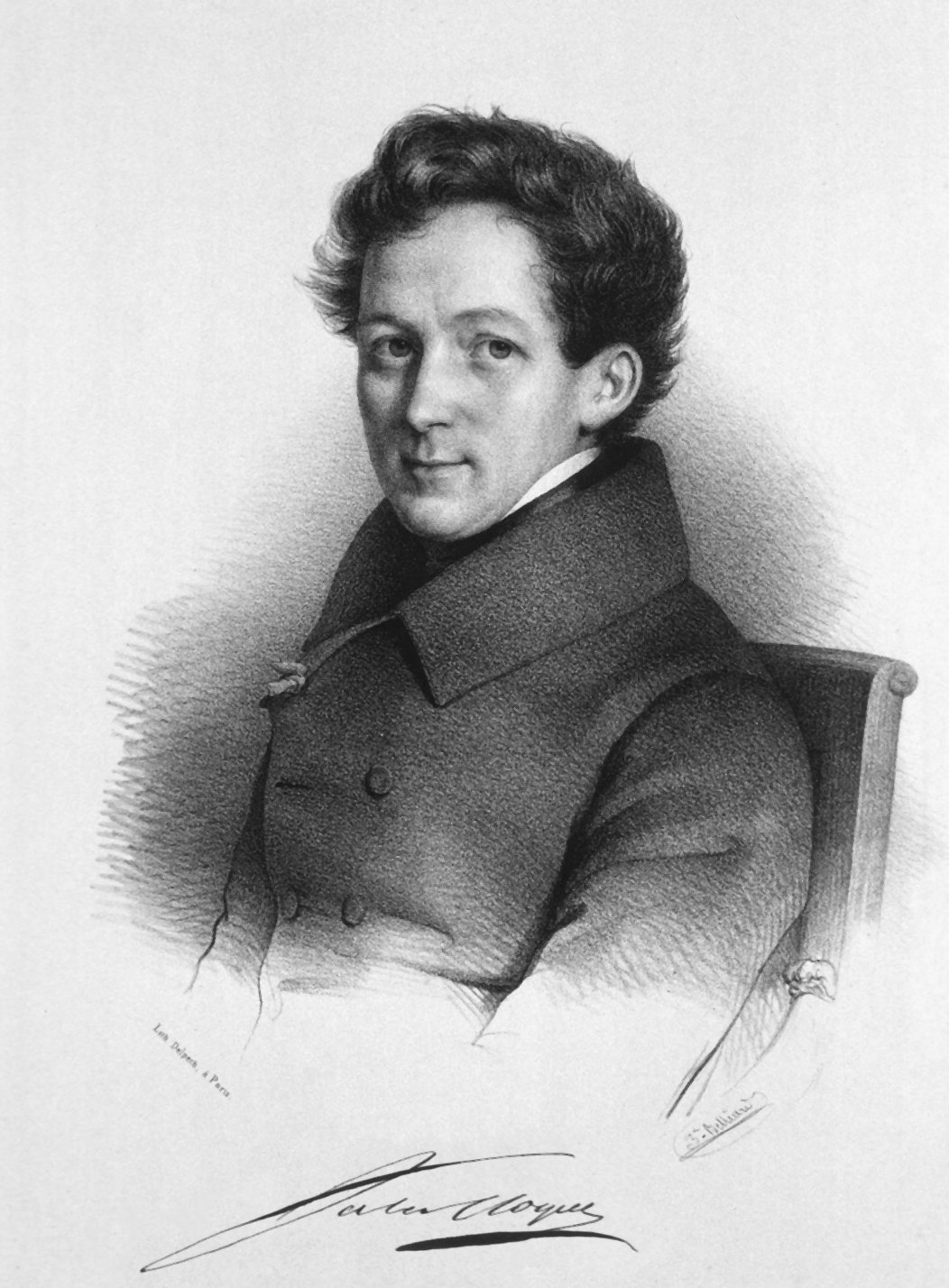
Jules Cloquet

Jules Germain Cloquet (18 December 1790 – 23 February 1883) was a French medical doctor and surgeon who was born and practiced medicine in Paris. His older brother, Hippolyte Cloquet (1787-1840) and his younger nephew Ernest Cloquet (1818-1855) were also physicians. In 1821 Jules Cloquet became one of the earliest members elected to the Académie Nationale de Médecine in Paris. In 1836, he was elected Honorary Fellow of the Royal College of Surgeons in Ireland.

Cloquet was known for his expertise as a surgeon, especially his work with hernial disorders. He was also the first to describe and identify the remnant of the embryonic hyaloid artery. This vestige was to become known as Cloquet's canal.

Cloquet's name is associated with three anatomical terms regarding the femoral canal:

- "Cloquet's hernia": a hernia of the femoral canal
- "Cloquet's septum": a fibrous membrane bounding the annulus femoralis at the base of the femoral canal
- "Cloquet's gland": small lymphatic nodes in the femoral canal

Cloquet was a skilled artist; in his best-known work, Anatomie de l'homme, most of the 1300 illustrations were drawn by him. He was the inventor of several surgical instruments, including an arterial forceps. He also had a keen interest in alternative medical practices such as mesmerism and acupuncture.

== External Reference ==
- Doyne's Hall of Fame (biography & list of written works by Jules Cloquet)
- web2.bium.univ-paris5.fr Manuel d'anatomie descriptive du corps humain by Jules Cloquet
- link.library.utoronto.ca Illustrations from Manuel d'anatomie...
