= Central retinal artery =

Blood vessel supplying the retina of the eye

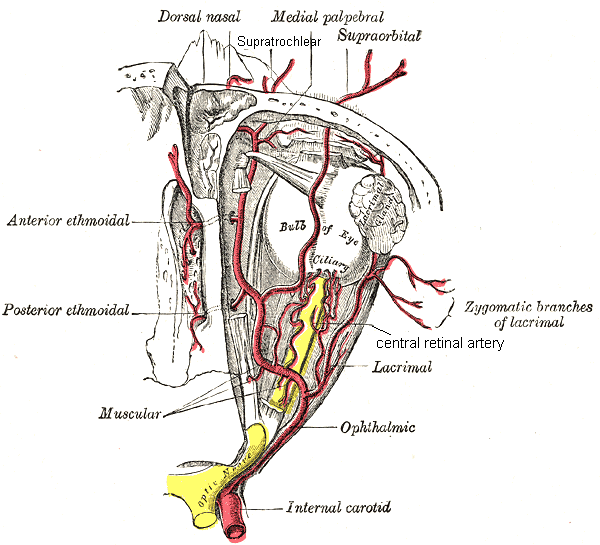
- The ophthalmic artery and its branches. (Central retinal artery visible at center.)

- Pulsatile blood flow in the central retinal artery revealed by laser Doppler holography

Details
- Source: Ophthalmic artery
- Vein: Central retinal vein
- Supplies: Retina

Identifiers
- Latin: arteria centralis retinae
- MeSH: D012161
- TA98: A12.2.06.024
- TA2: 4470
- FMA: 49879

The central retinal artery (retinal artery) branches off the ophthalmic artery, running inferior to the optic nerve within its dural sheath to the eyeball.

== Structure ==
The central retinal artery pierces the eyeball close to the optic nerve, sending branches over the internal surface of the retina, and these terminal branches are the only blood supply to the larger part of it.

The central part of the retina where the light rays are focused after passing through the pupil and the lens is a circular area called the macula. The center of this circular area is the fovea. The fovea and a small area surrounding it are not supplied by the central retinal artery or its branches, but instead by the choroid.

The central retinal artery is approximately 160 micrometres in diameter.

=== Variation ===
In some cases—approximately 20% of the population—there is a branch of the ciliary circulation called the cilio-retinal artery which supplies the retina between the macula and the optic nerve, including the nerve fibers from the foveal photoreceptors. If this artery is present, the central vision will be preserved even in case of central retinal artery occlusion (CRAO).

=== Development ===
The central retinal artery is formed from the proximal part of the hyaloid artery after atrophy of its distal part has formed the hyaloid canal.

== Function ==
The central retinal artery supplies blood to all the nerve fibers that form the optic nerve, which carries the visual information to the lateral geniculate nucleus of the thalamus, including those that reach over the fovea. Its blood flow can be revealed by fluorescein angiography or laser Doppler imaging.

== Clinical significance ==
Thus if the central retinal artery gets occluded, there is complete loss of vision in that eye even though the fovea is not affected. The entire retina (with the exception of the fovea) becomes pale and swollen and opaque while the central fovea still appears reddish (this is because the choroid color shows through). This is the basis of the famous "Cherry red spot" seen on examination of the retina on funduscopy of a central retinal artery occlusion (CRAO).

However it should be remembered that the Cilio retinal artery itself is a branch of the Short Posterior Ciliary Arteries which is derived from the Ophthalmic Artery. Therefore, its possible for the cilio retinal artery itself to occlude causing significant visual loss in the perfused macula region (surrounding visual field will remain intact).

== Other animals ==
In dogs, it is the continuation of the long ciliary artery.

== Additional images ==
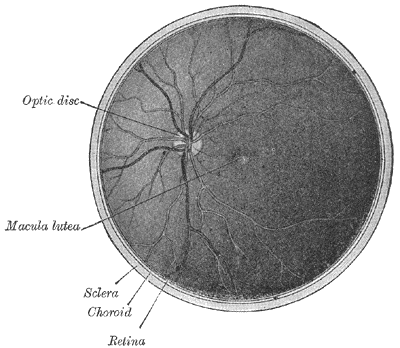
Interior of posterior half of bulb of left eye. The veins are darker in appearance than the arteries. (Central retinal artery visible but not labeled).

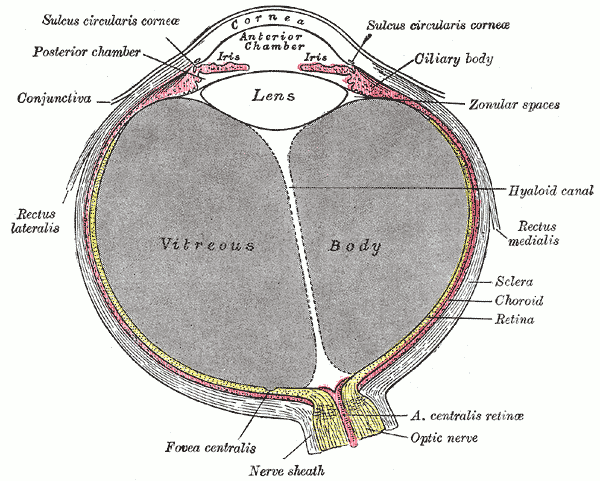
Horizontal section of the eyeball.

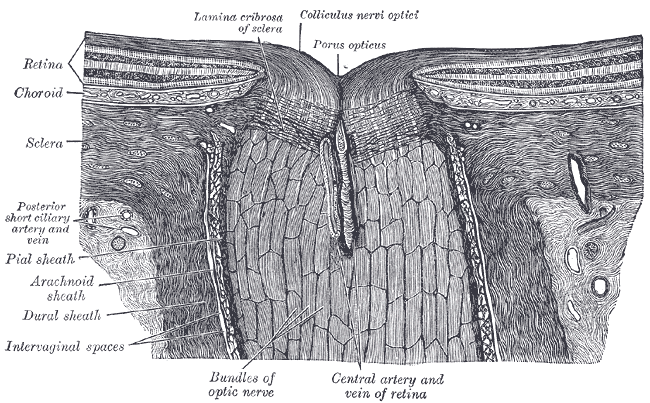
The terminal portion of the optic nerve and its entrance into the eyeball, in horizontal section.

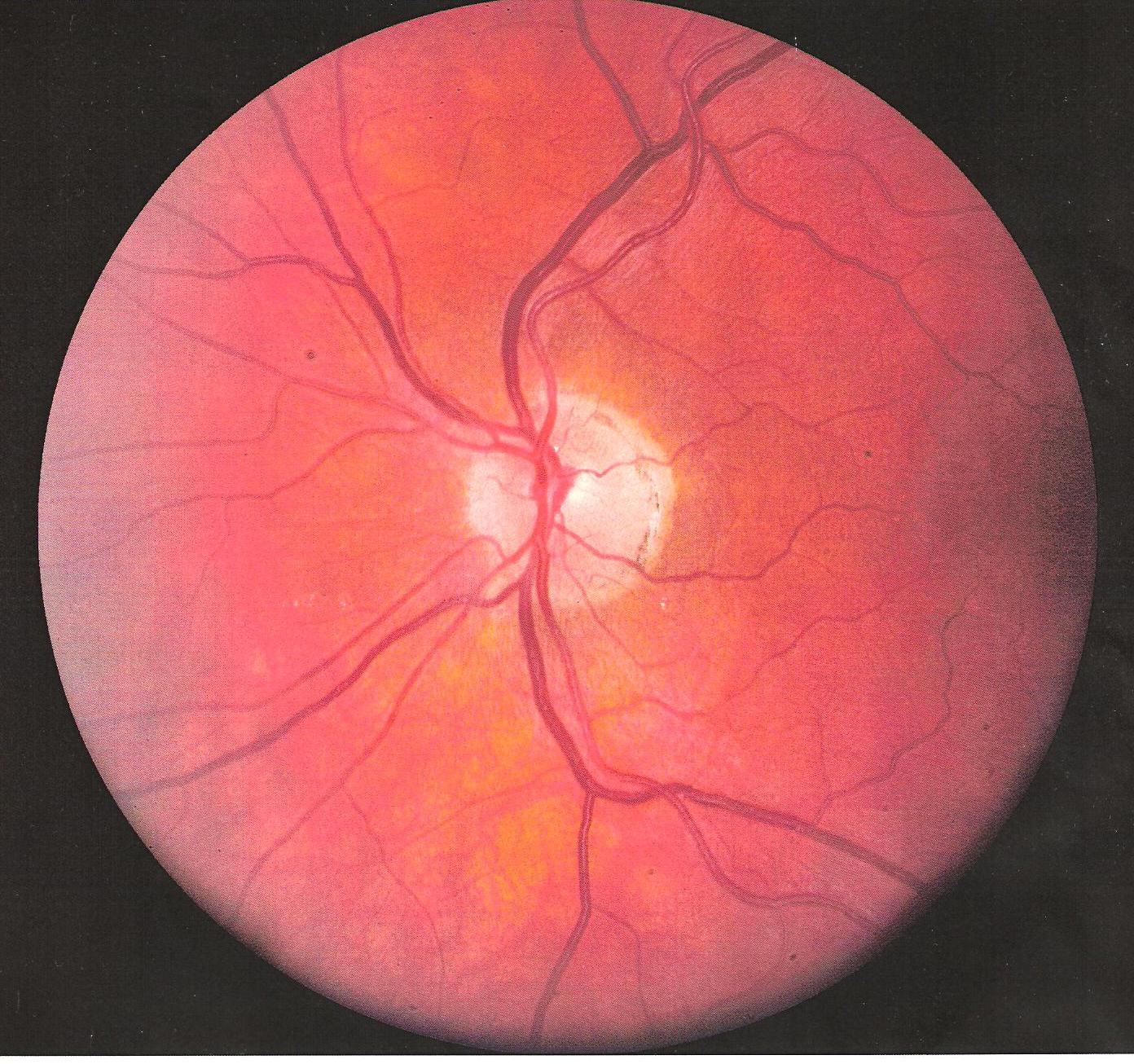
Eye vessels
