= Fibrous tunic of eyeball =

Part of a human eye

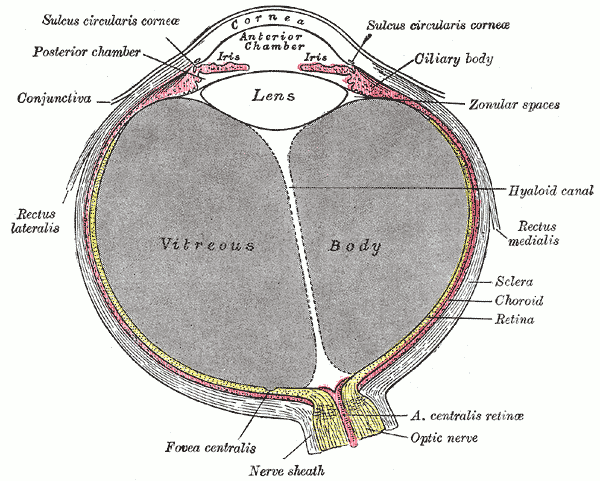
- Horizontal section of the eyeball. (Cornea labeled at top, sclera labeled at center right.)

Details

Identifiers
- Latin: tunica fibrosa bulbi, tunica fibrosa oculi
- TA98: A15.2.02.001
- TA2: 6743
- FMA: 58102

The sclera and cornea form the fibrous tunic of the bulb of the eye; the sclera is opaque, and constitutes the posterior five-sixths of the tunic; the cornea is transparent, and forms the anterior sixth.

The term "corneosclera" is also used to describe the sclera and cornea together.
