= Hippolyte Cloquet =

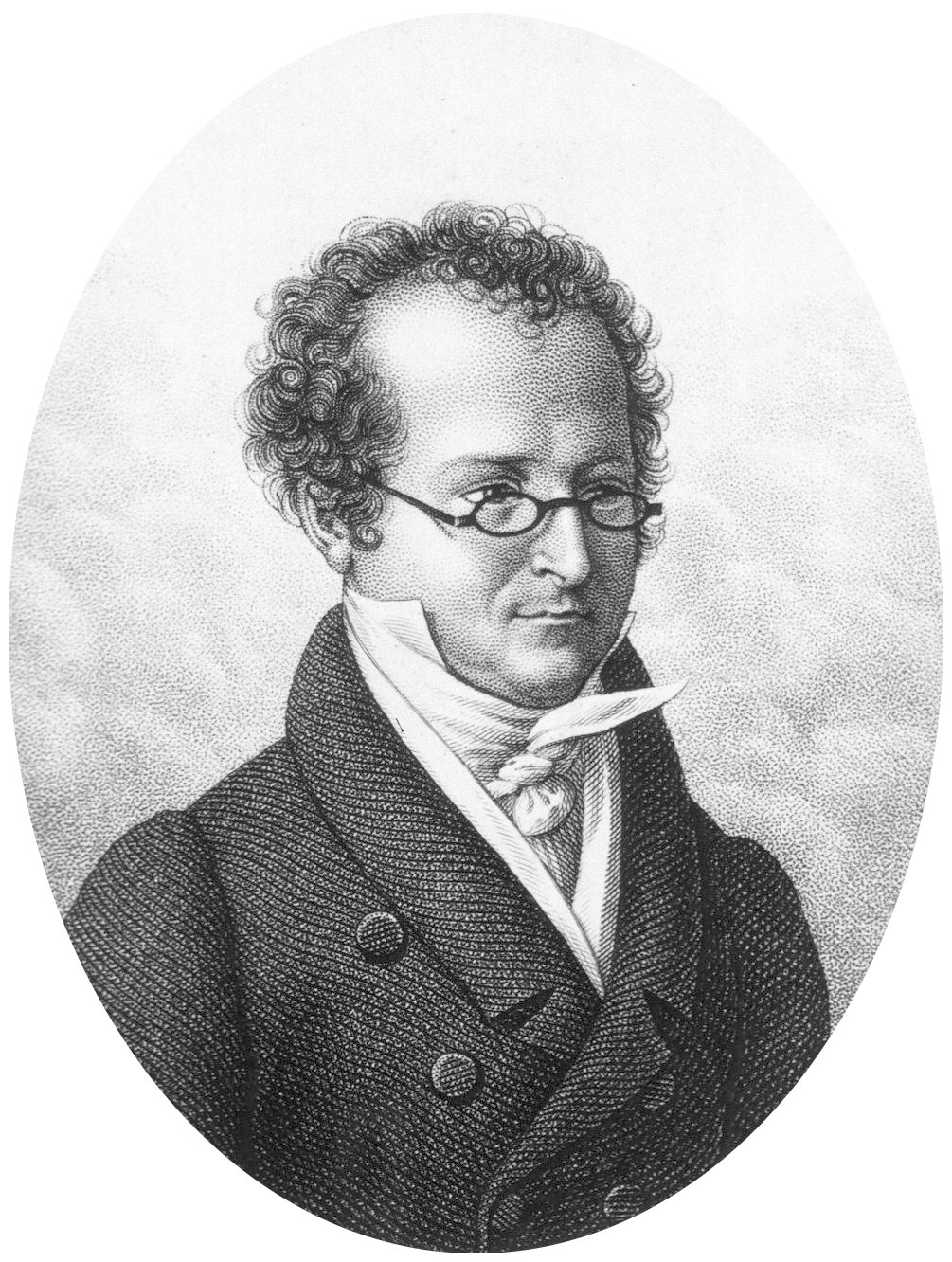
Hippolyte Cloquet

Hippolyte Cloquet (10 March 1787 – 3 March 1840) was a French medical doctor and anatomist who was a native of Paris. He was the brother of surgeon Jules Germain Cloquet (1790–1883), and father to Ernest Cloquet (1818–1855), who was a personal physician to Mohammad Shah Qajar of Persia.

He studied medicine in Paris, where he earned his doctorate in 1815. In 1823 he became a member of the Académie de Médecine.

Cloquet was a pioneer in the field of rhinology, and in 1821 published Osphrésiologie, ou traité des odeurs, which was a comprehensive treatise that discussed olfaction, diseases of the nose, deviations of the septum, rhinoplasty, et al. He was also author of Traité d'anatomie descriptive, an influential French text of anatomy that ran through six editions. The fourth edition of this work was translated into English by anatomist Robert Knox (1791–1862).

Cloquet also made contributions in the field of zoology, his treatise Poissons et Reptiles was included in the Dictionnaire des Sciences Naturelles.

== Associated eponyms ==
- Cloquet's ganglion: An enlargement of the nasopalatine nerve in the anterior palatine canal.
- Cloquet's space: A space between the ciliary zonule and the vitreous body.

== See also ==
- Category:Taxa named by Hippolyte Cloquet
