= Central retinal vein =

Vein in the retina of the eye

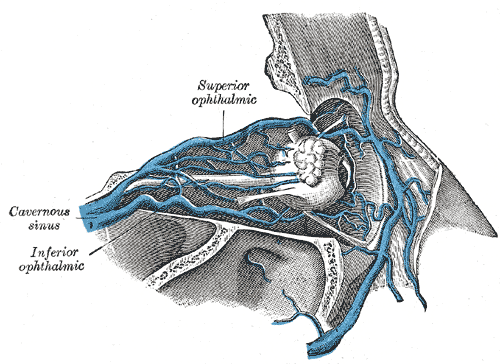
- Veins of orbit. (Central retinal vein not labeled, but region is visible - the vein is inside the optic nerve.)

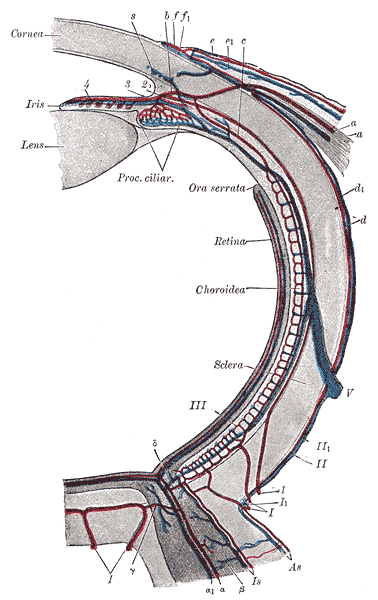
- Diagram of the blood vessels of the eye, as seen in a horizontal section. (Central retinal vein not labeled, but region is visible. The central retinal vein is at bottom running away from the retina through the optic nerve.)

Details
- Drains from: Retina
- Drains to: Superior ophthalmic vein or cavernous sinus
- Artery: Central retinal artery

Identifiers
- Latin: vena centralis retinae
- MeSH: D012169
- TA98: A12.3.06.111
- TA2: 4895
- FMA: 51799

The central retinal vein (retinal vein) is a vein that drains the retina of the eye. It travels backwards through the centre of the optic nerve accompanied by the central retinal artery before exiting the optic nerve together with the central retinal artery to drain into either the superior ophthalmic vein or the cavernous sinus.

== Structure ==
=== Origin ===
The central retinal vein is formed by the convergence of veins that drain retinal tissue. The central retinal vein originates within the eyeball, emerging from the eyeball already as a single unified vein.

=== Course ===
The central retinal vein runs through the centre of the optic nerve (alongside the central retinal artery) surrounded by a fibrous connective tissue envelope. It leaves the optic nerve 10 mm from the eyeball along with the central retinal artery, also exiting the meningeal envelope of the optic nerve.

=== Fate ===
The central retinal vein drains into either the superior ophthalmic vein or the cavernous sinus.

=== Variation ===
The central retinal vein varies between individuals. in some the central retinal vein drains into the superior ophthalmic vein, and in some it drains directly into the cavernous sinus.

== Clinical significance ==
=== Central retinal vein occlusion ===
The central retinal vein is the venous equivalent of the central retinal artery. Like that blood vessel, it can suffer from occlusion (central retinal vein occlusion). This occlusion is similar to that seen in ocular ischemic syndrome.

=== Papilledema ===
As the fluid surrounding the optic nerve within its meningeal envelope is contiguous with the cerebrospinal fluid of the central nervous system, increased intracranial pressure can cause compression of the central retinal vein where it emerges from the optic nerve (the accompanying artery is meanwhile less susceptible to compression due to its thicker arterial wall), with the resulting venous congestion causing oedema of the optic nerve (papilledema).

== Additional images ==
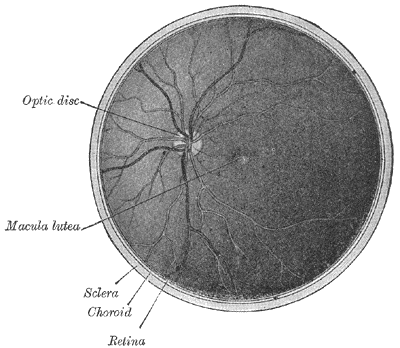
Interior of posterior half of bulb of left eye. The veins are darker in appearance than the arteries.

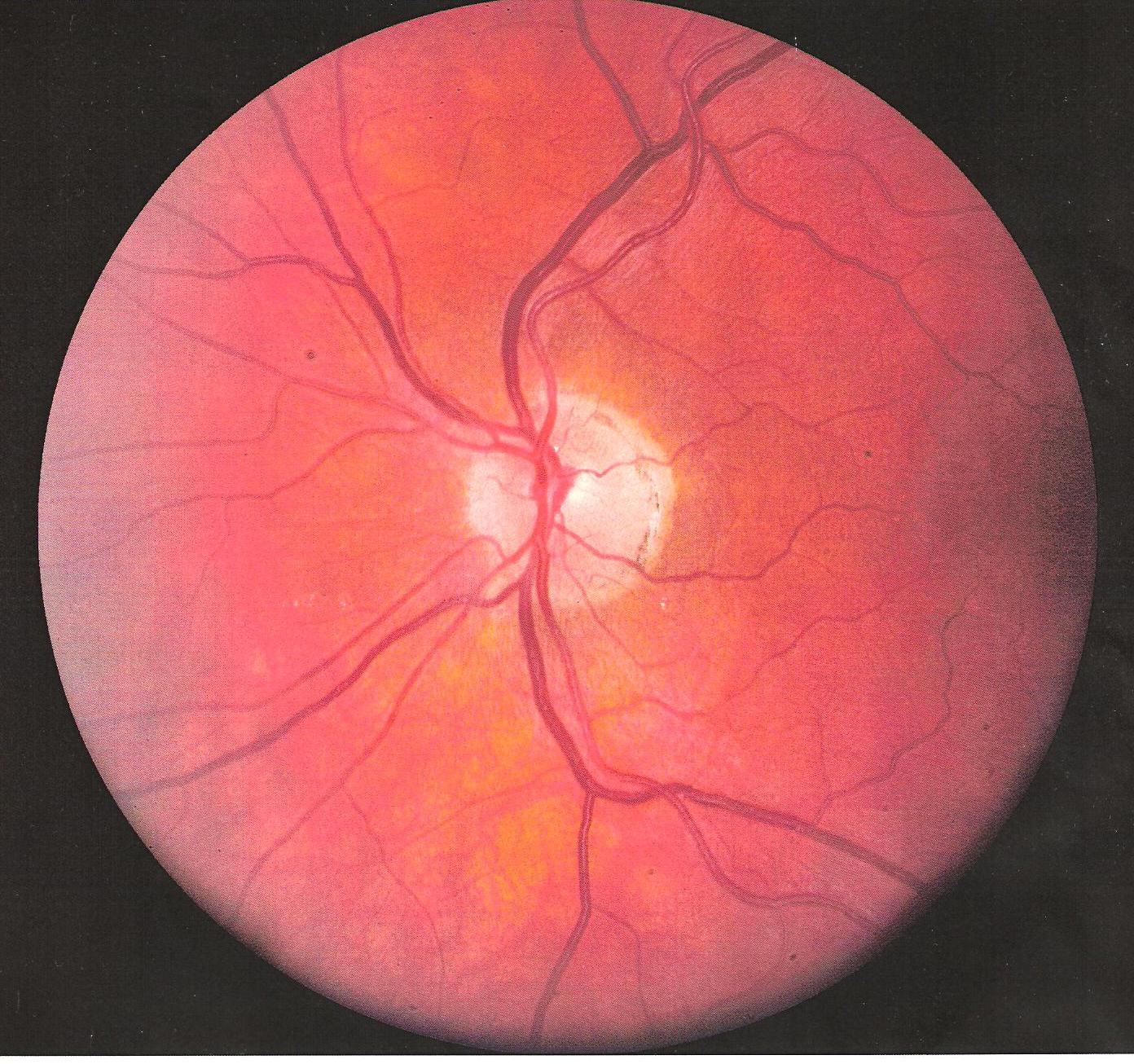
Eye vessels
