= Hyaloid canal =

Canal running from the optic nerve to the lens

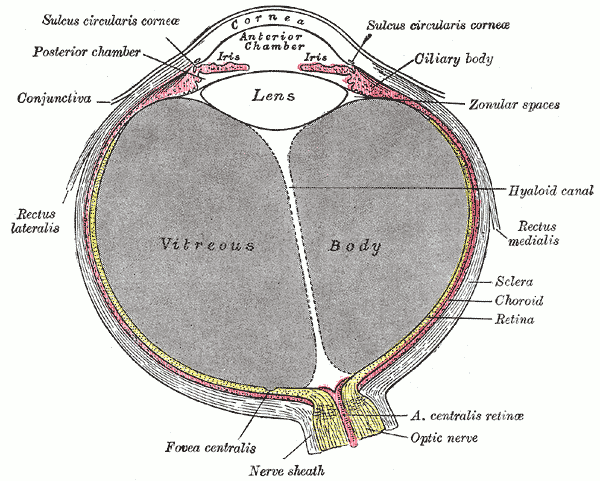
- Horizontal section of the eyeball. (Hyaloid canal labeled running through the centre.)

Details

Identifiers
- Latin: canalis hyaloideus
- TA98: A15.2.06.010
- TA2: 6811
- FMA: 58837

Schematic diagram of the human eye

The hyaloid canal (Cloquet's canal and Stilling's canal) is a small transparent canal running through the vitreous body from the optic nerve disc (at the punctum caecum) to the lens. It is formed by an invagination of the hyaloid membrane, which encloses the vitreous body.

In the fetus, the hyaloid canal contains a prolongation of the central artery of the retina, the hyaloid artery, which supplies blood to the developing lens. Once the lens is fully developed the hyaloid artery retracts and the hyaloid canal contains lymph. The hyaloid canal appears to have no function in the adult eye, though its remnant structure can be seen.

Contrary to initial belief, the hyaloid canal does not facilitate changes in the volume of the lens. The lens volume changes by less than 1% over its range of accommodation. Furthermore, lymph, being liquid, is incompressible, so even if the volume of the lens did change, the hyaloid canal could not compensate for it.

== See also ==
- Hyaloid artery
