= List of diseases (E) =

This is a list of diseases starting with the letter "E".

== Ea ==
- Earache
- Early miscarriage
- Eating disorder

== Eb ==
- Ebola virus disease

== Ec ==
=== Ech ===
- Echovirus infection

=== Ect ===
- Ectodermal dysplasia absent dermatoglyphics
- Ectodermal dysplasia adrenal cyst
- Ectodermal dysplasia alopecia preaxial polydactyly
- Ectodermal dysplasia anhidrotic
- Ectodermal dysplasia arthrogryposis diabetes mellitus
- Ectodermal dysplasia Bartalos type
- Ectodermal dysplasia Berlin type
- Ectodermal dysplasia blindness
- Ectodermal dysplasia ectrodactyly macular dystrophy
- Ectodermal dysplasia hypohidrotic autosomal dominant
- Ectodermal dysplasia hypohidrotic hypothyroidism ciliary dyskinesia
- Ectodermal dysplasia Margarita type
- Ectodermal dysplasia mental retardation CNS malformation
- Ectodermal dysplasia mental retardation syndactyly
- Ectodermal dysplasia neurosensory deafness
- Ectodermal dysplasia osteosclerosis
- Ectodermal dysplasia tricho odonto onychial type
- Ectodermal dysplasia, hydrotic
- Ectodermal dysplasia, hypohidrotic, autosomal recessive
- Ectodermal dysplasia
- Ectodermic dysplasia anhidrotic cleft lip
- Ectopia cordis
- Ectopia lentis
- Ectopia pupillae
- Ectopic coarctation
- Ectopic ossification familial type
- Ectopic pregnancy
- Ectrodactyly cardiopathy dysmorphism
- Ectrodactyly cleft palate syndrome
- Ectrodactyly diaphragmatic hernia corpus callosum
- Ectrodactyly dominant form
- Ectrodactyly polydactyly
- Ectrodactyly recessive form
- Ectrodactyly
- Ectrodactyly–ectodermal dysplasia–cleft syndrome
- Ectropion inferior cleft lip and or palate

=== Ecz ===
- Eczema

== Ed–Eg ==
- Edinburgh malformation syndrome
- Edwards–Patton–Dilly syndrome
- Edwards syndrome
- Eec syndrome without cleft lip palate
- Eec syndrome
- Eem syndrome
- Egg hypersensitivity
- Egg shaped pupils

== Eh–Ek ==
- Ehlers–Danlos syndrome
- Ehrlichiosis
- Eijkman's syndrome
- Eiken syndrome
- Eisenmenger syndrome
- Ekbom syndrome

== El–Em ==
- Elattoproteus in context of NF
- Elective mutism
- Ectrodactyly–ectodermal dysplasia–cleft syndrome
- Electron transfer flavoprotein, deficiency of
- Elejalde syndrome
- Elephant man in context of NF
- Elephantiasis
- Elliott–Ludman–Teebi syndrome
- Ellis–Yale–Winter syndrome
- Ellis–van Creveld syndrome
- Emerinopathy
- Emery–Nelson syndrome
- Emery–Dreifuss muscular dystrophy, dominant type
- Emery–Dreifuss muscular dystrophy, X-linked
- Emery–Dreifuss muscular dystrophy
- Emetophobia
- Emphysema, congenital lobar
- Emphysema
- Emphysema-penoscrotal web-deafness-mental retardation
- Empty sella syndrome

== En ==
=== Ena–Enc ===
- Enamel hypoplasia cataract hydrocephaly
- Encephalitis
- Encephalitis lethargica
- Encephalocraniocutaneous lipomatosis
- Encephalocele anencephaly
- Encephalocele anterior
- Encephalocele frontal
- Encephalocele
- Encephalomyelitis, myalgic
- Encephalomyelitis
- Encephalopathy
- Encephalopathy, chronic traumatic
- Encephalopathy, epileptic
- Encephalopathy, Fetal Alcohol
- Encephalopathy, Gluten
- Encephalopathy, Glycine
- Encephalopathy, Hashimoto's
- Encephalopathy, Hepatic
- Encephalopathy, HIV associated
- Encephalopathy, Hypertensive
- Encephalopathy, Hypoxic ischemic
- Encephalopathy, Lyme
- Encephalopathy, Mitochondrial
- Encephalopathy, Neonatal
- Encephalopathy, Static
- Encephalopathy, Toxic
- Encephalopathy, transmissible spongiform
- Encephalopathy, Uremic
- Encephalopathy, Wernicke's
- Encephalopathy intracerebral calcification retinal
- Encephalopathy progressive optic atrophy
- Encephalopathy subacute spongiform, Gerstmann-Sträussler
- Encephalopathy-basal ganglia-calcification
- Encephalopathy recurrent of childhood
- Encephalotrigeminal angiomatosis
- Enchondromatosis (benign)
- Enchondromatosis dwarfism deafness
- Enchondromatosis dwarfism calfness
- Encopresis

=== End–Ent ===
- Endocardial fibroelastosis
- Endocarditis, infective
- Endocarditis
- Endocrinopathy
- Endometrial stromal sarcoma
- Endometriosis
- Endomyocardial fibroelastosis
- Endomyocardial fibrosis
- Enetophobia
- Eng–Strom syndrome
- Engelhard–Yatziv syndrome
- Englemann disease
- Enolase deficiency type 1
- Enolase deficiency type 2
- Enolase deficiency type 3
- Enolase deficiency type 4
- Enolase deficiency
- Enterobiasis
- Enteropathica
- Enterovirus antenatal infection
- Entomophthoramycosis

=== Enu–Env ===
- Enuresis
- Envenomization by bothrops lanceolatus
- Envenomization by the Martinique lancehead viper
- Environment associated hypertension

== Eo ==
- Eosinophilia
- Eosinophilia–myalgia syndrome
- Eosinophilic cryptitis
- Eosinophilic cystitis
- Eosinophilic fasciitis
- Eosinophilic gastroenteritis
- Eosinophilic granuloma
- Eosinophilic lymphogranuloma
- Eosinophilic pustular folliculitis
- Eosinophilic myocarditis
- Eosinophilic synovitis
- Eosophobia

== Ep ==
=== Epe ===
- Ependymoblastoma
- Ependymoma

=== Epi ===
- Epicondylitis

==== Epid ====
===== Epide =====
====== Epidem ======
- Epidemic encephalitis
- Epidemic encephalomyelitis

====== Epider ======
Epiderma

- Epidermal nevus vitamin D resistant rickets

Epidermo Epidermod–Epidermoi

- Epidermodysplasia verruciformis
- Epidermoid carcinoma

Epidermol

- Epidermolysa bullosa simplex and limb girdle muscular dystrophy
- Epidermolysis bullosa acquisita
- Epidermolysis bullosa dystrophica, Bart type
- Epidermolysis bullosa dystrophica, dominant type
- Epidermolysis bullosa herpetiformis, Dowling–Meara
- Epidermolysis bullosa intraepidermic
- Epidermolysis bullosa inversa dystrophica
- Epidermolysis bullosa simplex with anodontia, hair
- Epidermolysis bullosa simplex, Cockayne–Touraine type
- Epidermolysis bullosa simplex, Koebner type
- Epidermolysis bullosa simplex, Ogna type
- Epidermolysis bullosa, dermolytic
- Epidermolysis bullosa, generalized atrophic benign
- Epidermolysis bullosa, junctional, Herlitz–Pearson
- Epidermolysis bullosa, junctional, with pyloric atrophy
- Epidermolysis bullosa, junctional
- Epidermolysis bullosa, pretibial
- Epidermolysis bullosa
- Epidermolytic hyperkeratosis
- Epidermolytic palmoplantar keratoderma Vorner type

===== Epidi =====
- Epididymitis

==== Epil–Epis ====
- Epilepsia partialis continua
- Epilepsy
- Epilepsy benign neonatal familial
  - Epilepsy benign neonatal familial 1
  - Epilepsy benign neonatal familial 2
  - Epilepsy benign neonatal familial 3
- Epilepsy juvenile absence
- Epilepsy mental deterioration Finnish type
- Epilepsy microcephaly skeletal dysplasia
- Epilepsy occipital calcifications
- Epilepsy progressive myoclonic
- Epilepsy telangiectasia
- Epilepsy with myoclono-astatic crisis
- Epilepsy, benign occipital
- Epilepsy, myoclonic progressive familial
- Epilepsy, nocturnal, frontal lobe type
- Epilepsy, partial, familial
- Epimerase deficiency
- Epimetaphyseal dysplasia cataract
- Epimetaphyseal skeletal dysplasia
- Epiphyseal dysplasia dysmorphism camptodactyly
- Epiphyseal dysplasia hearing loss dysmorphism
- Epiphyseal dysplasia multiple
- Epiphyseal stippling syndrome osteoclastic hyperplasia
- Epiphysealis hemimelica dysplasia

==== Epit ====
- Epithelial-myoepithelial carcinoma
- Epitheliopathy (APMPPE)
- Epitheliopathy, acute posterior multifocal placoid

=== Epp–Eps ===
- EPP (erythropoietic protoporphyria)
- Epstein-Barr virus mononucleosis
- Epstein syndrome

== Eq ==
- Equinophobia

== Er ==
- Erb–Duchenne palsy
- Erdheim disease
- Erdheim–Chester disease
- Ergophobia
- Eronen–Somer–Gustafsson syndrome
- Erosive pustular dermatosis of the scalp
- Erysipelas
- Erythema multiforme
- Erythema nodosum
- Erythermalgia
- Erythroblastopenia
- Erythroderma desquamativa of Leiner
- Erythroderma lethal congenital
- Erythrokeratodermia ataxia
- Erythrokeratodermia progressive symmetrica ichthyosis
- Erythrokeratodermia symmetrica progressiva
- Erythrokeratodermia variabilis ichthyosis
- Erythrokeratodermia variabilis, Mendes da Costa type
- Erythrokeratodermia with ataxia
- Erythrokeratolysis hiemalis ichthyosis
- Erythromelalgia
- Erythroplakia
- Erythroplasia of Queyrat
- Erythropoietic protoporphyria

== Es–Et ==
- Escher–Hirt syndrome
- Escherichia coli infection
- Esophageal atresia associated anomalies
- Esophageal atresia coloboma talipes
- Esophageal atresia
- Esophageal disorder
- Esophageal duodenal atresia abnormalities of hands
- Esophageal neoplasm
- Esophageal varices
- Esophoria
- Esotropia
- Essential fatty acid deficiency
- Essential hypertension
- Essential iris atrophy
- Essential mixed cryoglobulinemia
- Essential thrombocytopenia
- Essential thrombocythemia - synonym of Essential thrombocytosis
- Essential thrombocytosis
- Esthesioneuroblastoma
- Ethylmalonic aciduria
- Ethylmalonic adipic aciduria

== Eu–Ew ==
- Euhidrotic ectodermal dysplasia
- Eumycetoma
- Eunuchoidism familial
- Evan's syndrome
- Ewing's sarcoma

== Ex–Ey ==
- Exencephaly
- Exercise induced anaphylaxis
- Exfoliative dermatitis
- Exner syndrome
- Exogenous lipoid pneumonia
- Exomphalos-macroglossia-gigantism syndrome
- Exophoria
- Exophthalmos
- Exostoses anetodermia brachydactyly type E
- Exostoses, multiple
  - Exostoses, multiple, type 1
  - Exostoses, multiple, type 2
  - Exostoses, multiple, type 3
- Exostoses
- Exotropia
- Experimental allergic encephalomyelitis
- Exploding head syndrome
- Exstrophy of the bladder
- Exstrophy of the bladder-epispadias
- Exudative retinopathy familial, autosomal dominant
- Exudative retinopathy familial, autosomal recessive
- Exudative retinopathy familial, X linked, recessive
- Exudative retinopathy, familial
- Extrapyramidal disorder
- Extrasystoles short stature hyperpigmentation microcephaly
- Eye defects arachnodactyly cardiopathy
- Eyebrows duplication syndactyly
