= White dot syndromes =

Eye disease

White dot syndromes are inflammatory diseases characterized by the presence of white dots on the fundus, the interior surface of the eye. The majority of individuals affected with white dot syndromes are younger than fifty years of age. Some symptoms include blurred vision and visual field loss. There are many theories for the etiology of white dot syndromes including infectious, viral, genetics and autoimmune.

Classically recognized white dot syndromes include:

- Acute posterior multifocal placoid pigment epitheliopathy
- Birdshot chorioretinopathy
- Multiple evanescent white dot syndrome
- Acute zonal occult outer retinopathy
- Multifocal choroiditis and panuveitis
- Punctate inner choroiditis
- Serpiginous choroiditis

== Specific white dot syndromes ==
Specific characteristics regarding the white dots and predicted etiology are presented of selected diseases.

=== Acute posterior multifocal placoid pigment epitheliopathy ===
Acute posterior multifocal placoid pigment epitheliopathy primarily occurs in adults (with a mean age of 27). Symptoms include blurred vision in both eyes, but the onset may occur at a different time in each eye. There are yellow-white placoid lesions in the posterior pole at the level of the retinal pigment epithelium. Some suggest a genetic predisposition to the disease, while others postulate an abnormal immune response to a virus.

=== Multiple evanescent white dot syndrome ===
Multiple evanescent white dot syndrome occurs mostly in females. Symptoms include a sudden loss of central vision, but patients eventually regain normal vision. The white dots are small and located in the posterior pole at the level of the retinal pigment epithelium. The white dots may disappear after the first few weeks of the disease. The cause is generally unknown, but a viral illness has been reported prior to multiple evanescent white dot syndrom in one-third of cases. Since the disease occurs primarily in females, hormonal status might be a contributing factor.

=== Acute zonal occult outer retinopathy ===
Some discrepancy exists as to whether acute zonal occult outer retinopathy is considered a white dot syndrome. However, it may definitely be related to other diseases included in the white dot syndrome group. Acute zonal occult outer retinopathy occurs in young to middle age adults and may eventually progress to retinal cell death. Symptoms include acute visual field loss and photopsias. Suspected causes include autoimmune, viral, and fungal.

=== Multifocal choroiditis and panuveitis ===
Multifocal choroiditis occurs mainly in myopic females. The fundus presents with yellow or gray lesions (white dots) at the level of the choroid and retinal pigment epithelium. The size of the white dots are between 50 and 500 micrometres and localized in the macula. The disease is characterized by vitritis and anterior chamber inflammation. Decreased vision due to vitreous inflammation may occur. Unlike multiple evanescent white dot syndrome, multifocal choroiditis is a chronic disorder and macular scarring contributes to severe visual loss. Theories regarding the cause include an exogenous pathogen sensitizing an individual to antigens within photoreceptors, retinal pigment epithelium, or choroid.

=== Punctate inner choroiditis ===
Punctate inner choroiditis is an inflammatory choroiditis which occurs mainly in young females. Symptoms include blurred vision and scotomas. Gray-white or yellow lesions are mainly present in the posterior pole and are between 100 and 300 micrometres in size. Punctate inner choroiditis is one of the so-called White dot syndromes which come under the heading posterior uveitis. The appearance of punctate (punched out) areas is at the level of the inner choroid. These lesions are typically located centrally at the back of the eye, or the posterior pole.

=== Serpiginous choroiditis ===
Serpiginous choroiditis, also known as geographic or helicoid choroidopathy, is an uncommon chronic progressive inflammatory condition affecting adult men and women equally in the second to seventh decades of life.

== Nature of white dots ==
The white dots of the white dot syndromes are lesions that vary in their location in the fundus and in most cases tend to disappear. White dots appear early in the disease stages of punctate inner choroiditis and multiple evanescent white dot syndrome. In this case, the white dot is localized in the posterior pole, small (between 25 and 100 μm), and do not clump together. In contrast, white dots appear later in the disease stages of birdshot choroidopathy, serpiginous choroiditis, and acute posterior multifocal placoid pigment epitheliopathy. The white dots in these diseases may be present throughout the entire fundus, larger (50 to 500 μm), and tend to clump together. Among all these syndromes, there exists some retinal vessel inflammation. The differences in the dots are usually in the size, position, and depth of the lesion within the choroid.

The way in which the dots form in some of the white dot syndromes has been reported. The dot appears as a small granuloma which is composed of lymphocytes and macrophages. The lesion may occur within the choroid, between Bruch's membrane and retinal pigment epithelium, or between the retinal pigment epithelium and photoreceptors. Despite the differences in location, the white dots all are of similar composition. The center of the lesion consists of macrophages and epithelioid cells. CD4+ T cells are on the periphery of the granuloma. Benezra has theorized that a large amount of CD8+ T suppressor cells are observed in the later stages of the disease in order to down regulate the inflammatory immune reaction.

The formation of a granuloma occurs when activated antigen presenting cells, specifically dendritic cells, "bind to T cells and induce…the release of pro-inflammatory cytokines and chemokines." This response attracts additional antigen presenting cells and will eventually become a granuloma. Choroidal dendritic cells span several levels within the choroid and also associate with the retinal pigment epithelium. Usually, the dendritic cells disappear after removing the antigen. If removal did not occur, the formation of a granuloma would result. The white color of the dots when illuminated may be due to the granulomas composed only of "white cells". Each granuloma will disappear leaving no trace of its presence but in some cases it may leave a 'punched out' scar. The formation of white dots may occur more frequently, but is undetected. In normal cases, inflammation of the retina or choroid does not occur. Muller and retinal pigment epithelium cells normally release immunosuppressive factors, but certain combinations of cytokines may stimulate retinal pigment epithelium cells to release factors encouraging inflammation.

Generally, mild intraocular inflammation results in a small, discrete, evanescent lesions. Larger dots, having less discrete borders, are the result of high intensity intraocular inflammation. In essence, an immune response with the normal amount and appropriate cytokine release will result in small white dots and a misregulated response eventually will produce scarring of the retinal tissue. Treatment is required in the latter case to combat loss of vision. The white dots usually disappear naturally. Corticosteroids have been shown to speed up this process. The differences in the immune response of each patient may contribute to the differences seen between the white dot syndromes.

=== Distinct diseases ===
Due to the number of common features among the multiple syndromes, many suggest that the white dot syndromes are not distinct and represent a spectrum of one disease. Gass described the 'AZOOR complex' which consists of multiple evanescent white dot syndrome, nultifocal choroiditis, punctate inner choroiditis, acute idiopathic blind spot enlargement, acute macular neuroretinopathy, acute annular outer retinopathy, and acute zonal occult outer retinopathy. He suggested these diseases represent one disease due to common factors such as a high occurrence in females, unexplained visual field loss, and reduced electroretinographic amplitudes. Reddy et al. conducted a study on the blind spots in multifocal choroiditis, punctate inner choroiditis, multiple evanescent white dot syndrome, and diffuse subretinal fibrosis syndrome. Clinical and electroretinographic evidence suggested the diseases are distinct. However, numerous differences do occur in fundus appearance, the clinical course of the diseases, and electrophysiology.

=== Suspected etiology ===
One cause of the White Dot Syndromes as suggested by Gass involves viral or infectious agents. Specifically pertaining to the 'AZOOR complex,' Gass has postulated that a virus may enter the retina at the optic head and the infection may spread from one photoreceptor to another. Some unexplained features include the development of more than one disease in the same patient and the majority of cases occurring in females.

According to Becker's common genetic hypothesis, "unlike mendelian genetic disorders, common autoimmune and inflammatory diseases arise from combinatorial interactions of common non-disease specific loci, disease specific loci, and specific environmental triggers." An important aspect of this hypothesis pertains to the existence of common non-disease genes that predispose patients to autoimmune diseases. Jampol and Becker insinuate that 'common susceptibility genes' are present in patients affected by white dot syndromes. The presence of environmental triggers, such as viral infections, immunizations, and stress, and interactions with other genes contribute to the development of the white dot syndromes. Additionally, Jampol and Becker hypothesize that the predisposing genetic loci can be identified.

Gass points to a lack of evidence in support of the Becker theory. Instead, Gass highlights that although evidence indicates that patients with acute zonal occult outer retinopathy have a greater chance of developing autoimmune diseases, this does not mean that the complex of disorders are autoimmune diseases. This is supported by the difficulty in detecting "retinal autoantibodies" in patients with acute zonal occult outer retinopathy.

Two other diseases which also present with white dots on the fundus are retinitis punctata albescens and fundus albipunctatus. These diseases are not white dot syndromes, but have much more defined etiology. Retinitis punctata albescens is caused by mutations in RLBP1, the gene for retinaldehyde binding protein 1. In comparison, fundus albipunctatus is caused by mutations in RDH5 gene for an 11-cis-RDH in retinal pigment epithelium cells.

== See also ==
- Ophthalmology
- Retina
- Retinal pigment epithelium
