= Punctate inner choroiditis =

- Specialty: Ophthalmology

Punctate inner choroiditis (PIC) is an inflammatory choroiditis which occurs mainly in young women. Symptoms include blurred vision and scotomata. Yellow lesions are mainly present in the posterior pole and are between 100 and 300 micrometres in size. PIC is one of the so-called White Dot Syndromes. PIC has only been recognised as a distinct condition as recently as 1984 when Watzke identified 10 patients who appeared to make up a distinct group within the White Dot Syndromes.

== Signs and symptoms ==
• Typically affects short sighted (myopic) women. (90% of cases are female).

• The average age of patients with PIC is 27 years with a range of 16–40 years.

• Patients are otherwise healthy and there is usually no illness, which triggers the condition or precedes it.

• The inflammation is confined to the back of the eye (posterior). There is no inflammation in the front of the eye (anterior chamber) or vitreous (the clear jelly inside the eye). This is an important distinguishing feature of PIC.

• It usually affects both eyes.

• The appearance of gray-white or yellow punctate (punched out) areas (lesions) at the level of the inner choroid. These lesions are typically located centrally at the back of the eye (posterior pole).

Symptoms typically include:

1. Blurring of vision
2. Partial ‘blind spots’ or scotoma. These areas of diminished or lost areas of the visual field are typically near the centre of vision but occasionally can be peripheral. These may be temporary or permanent.
3. Seeing flashing lights. This is known as photopsia.

The PIC lesions, which form scars deep in the choroid layer of the eye, may result in new blood vessels forming. These can be seen as the body’s attempts at repair, but these new blood vessels (neovascularisation) are weak, can spread to form a membrane and can threaten the vision. It is suspected that at least 40% of patients with PIC develop CNV (choroidal neovascularization). This is a complication, which can occur in other white dot syndromes and other eye conditions such as macular degeneration but occurs rarely in other forms of uveitis.

CNV is a sight threatening complication and so must be picked up early and always treated. It may occur whether the uveitis is active or not. CNV, if not treated, may lead to subretinal fibrosis (scarring), a further complication, which is more difficult to treat, and which leads to poor vision.

Good monitoring for patients with PIC is therefore very important.

== Cause ==
There are no known causes of PIC, but may represent an autoimmune type of uveitis.

== Diagnosis ==
Diagnosis of PIC can be difficult because the appearance may be similar to other conditions and types of posterior uveitis, especially other forms of the so-called white dot syndromes. The diagnosis is made by eliminating all the other possibilities by careful examination by an experienced ophthalmologist, aided with visual field testing and Fluorescein angiography.

It is important that the correct diagnosis is made because treatment may be quite different for apparently similar conditions.

=== Natural course of the condition ===
What happens with PIC depends a lot on the presence or absence of an important complication, Choroidal neovascularization (known as CNV).

Often, the inflammation in PIC is self-limiting, not always requiring treatment.

However treatment is advised if there are many active or central lesions, or if there are signs of CNV.

== Treatment ==
It is important to distinguish between treatment of the underlying inflammation (PIC) and the treatment of CNV.

2-pronged approach:

Treatment is not always necessary and observation may be appropriate for lesions if they are found in non-sight threatening areas (that is not centrally).

Active lesions of PIC can be treated with corticosteroids taken systemically (tablets) or regionally by injections around the eye (periorbital). It has been argued that treating lesions in this way may help minimise the development of CNV.

The treatment of CNV:

Early treatment is required for this complication. There are several possible treatment methods, but none of these treatments appears to be singly effective for the treatment of CNV.

1. Corticosteroids: systemic or intraocular
2. ‘Second line’ immunosuppressants: There is evidence that combined therapies of steroids and second line immunosuppressants may be important.
3. Surgical excision of the affected area in well selected cases.
4. Intravitreal anti-VEGF agents. Examples are bevacizumab (avastin) and ranibizumab. These relatively new drugs are injected into the eye.
5. Photodynamic therapy (PDT): A photosensitive drug is ‘activated’ by strong light. Consideration may be given to combined therapy of PDT and anti VEGF.
6. Laser photocoagulation: This is occasionally used unless the CNV is subfoveal (affecting the central or macular part of the vision). The laser treatment can damage the vision.

The use of the intravitreal anti VEGF agents namely bevacizumab and ranibizumab have been described recently. The current evidence supporting the use of anti-VEGF agents is based on retrospective case studies and could not be described as strong. However, further data from prospective controlled trials are needed before the therapeutic role of anti-VEGF therapy in the uveitis treatment regimen can be fully determined. The anti VEGF agents furthermore have not been shown to have an anti-inflammatory effect.

Thus, treatment of the underlying inflammatory disease should play a central role in the management of uveitic CNV. A two-pronged treatment that focuses on achieving control of inflammation through the use of corticosteroids and/or immunosuppressive agents, while treating complications that arise despite adequate disease control with intravitreal anti-VEGF agents, may be useful.

Regular monitoring is essential to achieve a good outcome. This is because even if there is no active inflammation, there may still be occult CNV which requires treatment to avoid suffering vision loss.

== Prognosis ==
The visual prognosis of eyes with PIC that do not develop subfoveal CNV is good. If CNV is picked up early and treated appropriately then the visual outcome can also be good. Frequent monitoring is important to ensure a good outcome. Poor vision occurs mostly with subfoveal CNV or if subretinal fibrosis (scarring) has formed.

The above information comes from a Fact sheet produced by the Uveitis Information Group May 2011. It has been factually checked by a member of the charity's Professional Medical Panel.
