= Progressive bifocal chorioretinal atrophy =

- Specialty: Medical genetics
- Complications: Blindness
- Causes: Point mutation in genetic region close to the PDRM13 gene.
- Deaths: None are directly related to it

Progressive bifocal chorioretinal atrophy, also known for its abbreviations PBCRA or CRAPB, is a rare, slowly progressive, autosomal dominant syndrome characterized by relatively large-sized atrophic hole-shaped lesions in the macular and nasal retina, myopia, low visual acuity, and nystagmus. It has been described in one family from Scotland and two families from France. The condition is caused by point mutations in a region in the long arm of chromosome 6 (6q16.2) that has been found responsible for the pathogenesis of other macular dystrophies.

Electro-oculographic and electroretinographic studies done on patients with the disease show abnormalities in the way cones and rods function.

Color vision has been found to be relatively unaffected in patients with the condition.

== Progression ==
There are three stages a patient with the disease goes through:

- First stage: This is the initial phase of the condition, and it takes place from birth to the age of 14 years old; it is characterized by the appearance of a large, perforated chorioretinal atrophic lesion at the central part of the macula which contains the vascular arch, alongside extra-macular white deposits and localized areas of hyperpigmentation in the retinal pigment epithelium. The heads of the optic nerve start taking a vertical ovaloid shape during this stage.
- Second stage: This stage of the condition takes place from the age of 15 to 45 years old. In this phase of the condition, the previously mentioned macular perforation starts growing outside its original starting point, beyond the vascular arch, with relatively new spots of atrophy in the nasal retina starting to join into one, making one white, chorioretinal atrophic lesion as a result. Patients also start reporting visual hallucinations of flashing lights (photopsias) during this stage. Myopia, which is previously absent in affected patients, starts becoming apparent during one's 20th years of life.
- Third stage: This is the final stage, and it takes place at the age of 46 years old and later. In this stage, the previously mentioned atrophic lesions of the macula and the nasal retina expand and grow towards the optic disc, which consequently results in a narrow bridge of intact retina that passes through the optic disc in a vertical manner. During this stage, patients are more likely to report having difficulties seeing in low-light conditions.

== History ==
The condition was described fully in 1968 by Douglas et al.; their patients were 34 members from a large Scottish family from Dundee, Scotland, of which, 26 were still alive at the time of the study. The youngest and oldest affected members were 4 days old and 63 years old, respectively. The first known member of the family affected with PBCRA was a milk roundsman who lived in 19th-century Scotland.

In 2019, Silva et al. described 2 families; 5 members from a 3-generation French family and a mother and son. In addition to the typical symptoms of the condition, the affected members of the French family also reported photophobia. The stages of their progressive disease were very similar to the ones found on Godley's Scottish family.

The first genetic clue to this condition was found by Kelsell et al. in 1995, on the 5-generation Scottish family originally described by Douglas et al. (1968); by doing a linkage analysis study on a region of chromosome 6 (6q11-q16.2, to be exact) that has already been described as being involved in 2 other macular dystrophies (Stargardt disease 3 and North Carolina macular dystrophy), they narrowed down the PBCRA locus (the area in chromosome 6 that may contain the causative gene for the condition) to 6q14-q16.2, between genetic markers D6S249 and D6S283.

The causative mutations for this condition were discovered in 2019 by Silva et al. through whole genome sequencing of their respective families (The 3-generation French family and the mother-son pair, to be precise) and the Scottish family reported in 1968 by Douglas et al.; the first mutation, found in the large French and Scottish families, was located in DHS6S1 (DNase1 hypersensitivity region), a genetic region 7.8 kilobases upstream of the PRDM13 gene's transcription start site, and while this specific point mutation was absent in the mother-son pair, they found another mutation in said set of patients; a point mutation 21 base pairs away from the genetic variation found in the first two families. Both of the mutations reported in Silva's study were present in a heterozygous state.
