= Optic disc drusen =

- Other names: Optic nerve head drusen
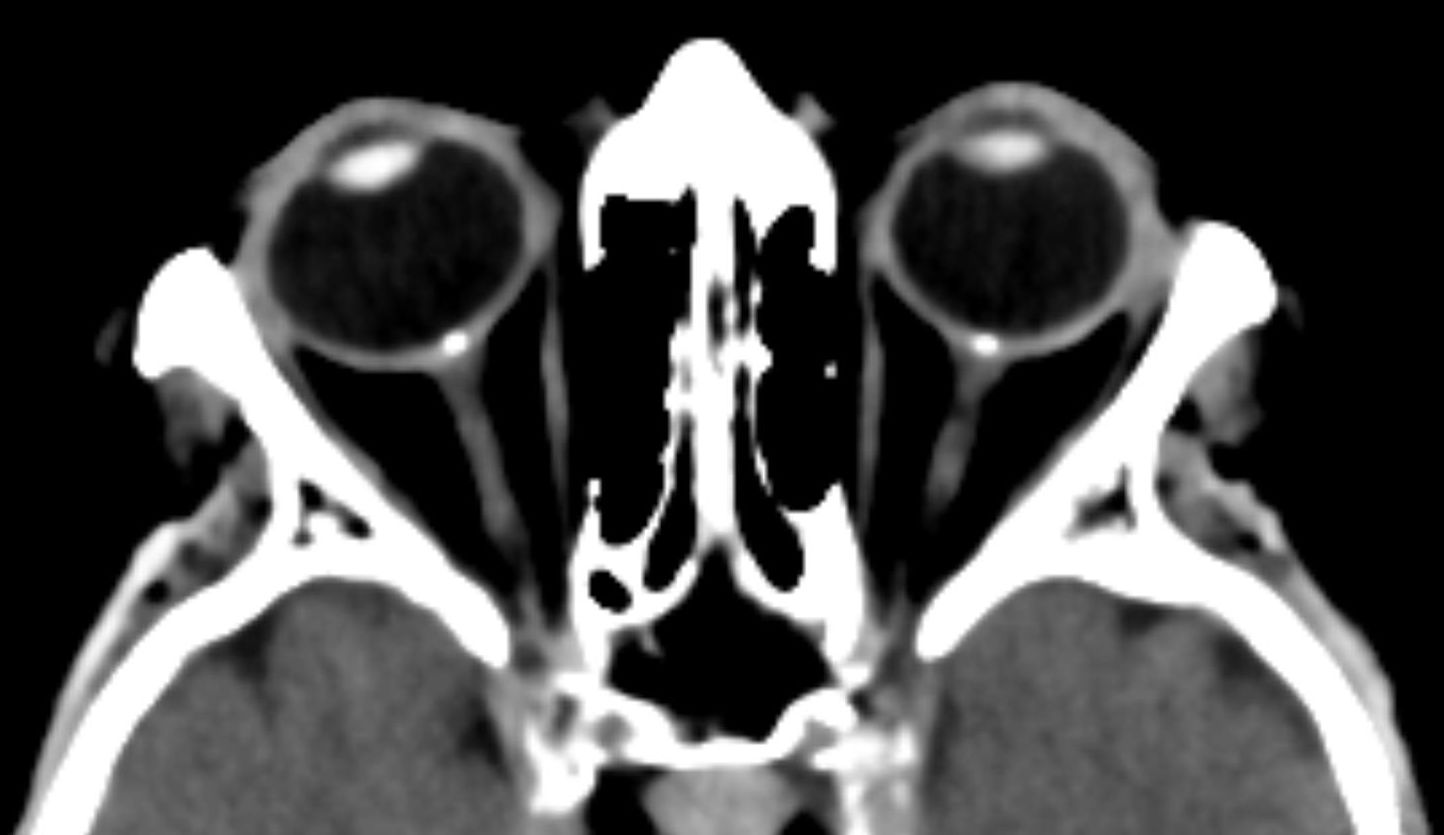
- Bilateral optic disc drusen in computed tomography seen as dense spots at the optical disc
- Specialty: Neurology

Optic disc drusen (ODD) are globules of mucoproteins and mucopolysaccharides that progressively calcify in the optic disc. They are thought to be the remnants of the axonal transport system of degenerated retinal ganglion cells. ODD have also been referred to as congenitally elevated or anomalous discs, pseudopapilledema, pseudoneuritis, buried disc drusen, and disc hyaline bodies.

== Presentation ==
ODD is often asymptomatic with clear vision, but symptomatic patients can present with a variety of visual field defects. These may include enlarged blind spots, nasal field loss, or arcuate and sectional field losses. The location and size of the defect often correlates with the size and location of the ODD. ODD can also present similarly to do papilledema by crowding the optic disc, thus making it crucial to differentiate the presentation with further testing and imaging. Since ODD is not true papilledema which would correlate with increased intracranial pressures, it can present as a type of pseudopapilledema.

== Anatomy ==
The optic nerve is a cable connection that transmits images from the retina to the brain. It consists of over one million retinal ganglion cell axons. The optic nerve head, or optic disc is the anterior end of the nerve that is in the eye and hence is visible with an ophthalmoscope. It is located nasally and slightly inferior to the macula of the eye. There is a blind spot at the optic disc because there are no rods or cones beneath it to detect light. The central retinal artery and vein can be seen in the middle of the disc as it exits the scleral canal with the optic nerve to supply the retina. The vessels send branches out in all directions to supply the retina.

== Pathophysiology ==
In children, optic disc drusen are usually buried and undetectable by fundoscopy except for a mild or moderate elevation of the optic disc. With age, the overlying axons become atrophied and the drusen become exposed and more visible. They may become apparent with an ophthalmoscope and some visual field loss at the end of adolescence. ODD can compress and eventually compromise the vasculature and retinal nerve fibers. Rarely, choroidal neovascularization may develop as the juxtapapillary nerve fibers are disrupted, with subsequent subretinal hemorrhage and retinal scarring. Even more rarely, vitreous hemorrhage may develop.

== Diagnosis ==
=== Differential diagnosis ===
In most patients, optic disc drusen are an incidental finding. It is important to differentiate them from other conditions that present with optic disc elevation, especially papilledema, which could imply raised intracranial pressure or tumors. True papilledema may present with exudates or cotton-wool spots, unlike ODD. The optic disc margins are characteristically irregular in ODD but not blurred as there is no swelling of the retinal nerve fibers. Spontaneous venous pulsations are present in about 80 percent of patients with ODD, but absent in cases of true disc edema. Other causes of disc elevation clinicians must exclude may be: hyaloid traction, epipapillary glial tissue, myelinated nerve fibres, scleral infiltration, vitreopapillary traction and high hyperopia. Disorders associated with disc elevation include: Alagille syndrome, Down syndrome, Kenny-Caffey syndrome, Leber's hereditary optic neuropathy and linear nevus sebaceous syndrome.

== Management ==
Patients with optic disc drusen should be monitored periodically via ophthalmoscopy, Snellen acuity, contrast sensitivity, color vision, intraocular pressure and threshold visual fields. For those with visual field defects optical coherence tomography has been recommended for follow-up of nerve fiber layer thickness. Associated conditions such as angioid streaks and retinitis pigmentosa should be screened for. Both the severity of optic disc drusen and the degree of intraocular pressure elevation have been associated with visual field loss. There is no widely accepted treatment for ODD, although some clinicians will prescribe eye drops designed to decrease the intra-ocular pressure and theoretically relieve mechanical stress on fibers of the optic disc. Rarely choroidal neovascular membranes may develop adjacent to the optic disc threatening bleeding and retinal scarring. Laser treatment or photodynamic therapy or other evolving therapies may prevent this complication.

== Prognosis ==
Optic nerve damage is progressive and insidious. Some of patients will develop some peripheral field defects. These can include nasal step defects, enlarged blind spots, arcuate scotomas, sectoral field loss and altitudinal defects. Clinical symptoms correlate to visibility of the drusen. Central vision loss is a rare complication of bleeding from peripapillar choroidal neovascular membranes. Anterior ischemic optic neuropathy (AION) is a potential complication.

== Epidemiology ==
Optic disc drusen are found clinically in about 1% of the population but this increases to 3.4% in individuals with a family history of ODD. About two thirds to three quarters of clinical cases are bilateral. A necropsy study of 737 cases showed a 2.4% incidence with 2 out of 15 (13%) bilateral, perhaps indicating the insidious nature of many cases. An autosomal dominant inheritance pattern with incomplete penetrance and associated inherited dysplasia of the optic disc and its blood supply is suspected. Males and females are affected at equal rates. Caucasians are the most susceptible ethnic group. Certain conditions have been associated with disc drusen such as retinitis pigmentosa, angioid streaks, Usher syndrome, Noonan syndrome and Alagille syndrome. Optic disc drusen are not related to Bruch membrane drusen of the retina which have been associated with age-related macular degeneration.

== See also ==
- Drusen
