= Optical coherence tomography angiography =

Imaging technique to visualise vascular networks in the retina

Optical coherence tomography angiography (OCTA) is a non-invasive imaging technique based on optical coherence tomography (OCT) developed to visualize vascular networks in the human retina, choroid, skin and various animal models. OCTA may make use of speckle variance optical coherence tomography.

OCTA uses motion contrast between cross-sectional OCT scans (B-frames) to differentiate blood flow from static tissue, enabling imaging of vascular anatomy. To correct for patient movement during scanning, bulk tissue changes in the axial direction are eliminated, ensuring that all detected changes are due to red blood cell movement. This form of OCT requires a very high sampling density in order to achieve the resolution needed to detect the tiny capillaries found in the retina. This has allowed OCTA to obtain detailed images of retinal vasculature in the human retina and become widely used clinically to diagnose a variety of eye diseases, such as age related macular degeneration (AMD), diabetic retinopathy (DR), artery and vein occlusions, and glaucoma.

== Medical uses ==
While conventional dye-based angiography is still the common gold standard, OCTA has been evaluated and used across many diseases. OCTA was first introduced in clinical eyecare in 2014.

OCTA has applications in several diseases, including leading causes of blindness such as glaucoma and age-related macular degeneration. In diabetic retinopathy (DR), OCTA was shown to resolve previously established markers of severe disease (i.e., vitreous proliferation). Moreover, OCTA was shown to provide a plethora of additional biomarkers including subclinical loss of vessel density. Thus, OCTA may offer in future the potential to monitor the progression of DR at an earlier, pre-clinical state. Similarly, OCTA was shown to provide more refined information compared to dye-based angiography in other vascular occlusive diseases such as central (or branch) retinal vein occlusion.

== How it works ==
OCTA detects moving particles (red blood cells) by comparing sequential B-scans at the same cross-sectional location. To simply put it, the backscattered light reflected back from static samples would remain the same over multiple B-scans while the backscattered light reflected back from moving samples would fluctuate. Multiple algorithms have been proposed and utilized to contrast such motion signals from static signals in various biological tissues.

=== Calculating blood flow ===
An algorithm developed by Jia et al. is used to determine blood flow in the retina. The split-spectrum amplitude decorrelation angiography (SSADA) algorithm calculates the decorrelation in the reflected light that is detected by the OCT device.

The blood vessels are where the most decorrelation occurs allowing them to be visualized, while static tissue has low decorrelation values. The equation takes into account fluctuations of the received signal amplitude or intensity over time. Greater fluctuations receive a greater decorrelation value and indicate more movement.

A significant challenge when trying to image the eye is patient movement and saccadic movement of the eye. Movement introduces a lot of noise into the signal making tiny vessels impossible to distinguish. One approach to decreasing the influence of movement on signal detection is to shorten the scanning time. A short scan time prevents too much patient movement during signal acquisition. With the development of Fourier-domain OCT, spectral-domain OCT, and swept source signal acquisition time was greatly improved making OCTA possible. OCTA scan time is now around three seconds, however, saccadic eye movement still causes a low signal-to-noise ratio. This is where SSADA proves to be very advantageous as it is able to greatly improve SNR by averaging the decorrelation across the number of B-scans, making the microvasculature of the retina visible.

== History ==
Initial efforts to measure blood flow using OCT utilized the Doppler effect. By comparing the phase of successive A-mode scans, the velocity of blood flow can be determined via the Doppler equation. This was deemed Optical Doppler Tomography; the development of spectral domain OCT (SD-OCT) and swept-source OCT (SS-OCT) greatly improved scan times since this phase information was readily accessible. Still, Doppler techniques were fundamentally limited by bulk eye motion artefacts, especially as longer scan times became important for increasing sensitivity. In the mid-2000s systems began compensating for bulk eye motion, which significantly reduced motion artefacts. Systems also began to measure the variance and power of the Doppler phase between successive A-mode and B-mode scans; later it was shown that successive B-mode scans must be corrected for motion and the phase variance data must be thresholded to remove bulk eye motion distortion.

By 2012, split spectrum amplitude decorrelation was shown to be effective at increasing SNR and decreasing motion artefacts. Commercial OCT-A devices also emerged around this time, beginning with the OptoVue AngioVue in 2014 (SD-OCT) and the Topcon Atlantis/Triton soon after (SS-OCT).

== Other angiography techniques ==
The most common angiographic techniques were fluorescein (FA) or indocyanine green angiography (ICGA), which both involve the use of an injectable dye. Intravenous dye injection is time-consuming and can have adverse side effects. Furthermore, the edges of the capillaries can become blurred due to dye leakage and imaging of the retina can only be 2D when using this method. With OCTA, dye injection is not needed making the imaging process faster and more comfortable while at the same time improving the quality of the image.

The current gold standards of angiography, fluorescein angiography (FA) and indocyanine green angiography (ICGA), both require dye to be injected.

OCTA does not need dye but is susceptible to motion artefacts. The dyes used in FA and ICGA can cause nausea, vomiting, and general discomfort, and only have an effective lifetime on the order of a few minutes.

From a physics perspective, both dye-based methods utilize the phenomenon of fluorescence. For FA, this corresponds to an excitation wavelength of blue (around 470 nm) and an emission wavelength near yellow (520 nm). For IGCA, the newer method, the excitation wavelength is between 750 and 800 nm while emission occurs above 800 nm.
