= Speckle variance optical coherence tomography =

Speckle variance optical coherence tomography (SV-OCT) is an imaging algorithm for functional optical imaging. Optical coherence tomography is an imaging modality that uses low-coherence interferometry to obtain high resolution, depth-resolved volumetric images. OCT can be used to capture functional images of blood flow, a technique known as optical coherence tomography angiography (OCT-A). SV-OCT is one method for OCT-A that uses the variance of consecutively acquired images to detect flow at the micron scale. SV-OCT can be used to measure the microvasculature of tissue. In particular, it is useful in ophthalmology for visualizing blood flow in retinal and choroidal regions of the eye, which can provide information on the pathophysiology of diseases.

== Introduction ==
Color fundus photography, fluorescein angiography (FA) and indocyanine green angiography (ICGA) are methods for imaging retinal microvasculature networks. However, these methods have drawbacks in that they require the use of exogenous contrast agents. In addition, the images acquired using these techniques are two dimensional in nature and therefore lack depth information. OCT has several advantages that make it appealing for volumetric imaging of vasculature structure. Namely, OCT is able to acquire depth-resolved localization at high spatial and temporal resolutions, does not require exogenous contrast agents, and is non-invasive and contactless.

OCT gave rise to a family of techniques to perform OCT-A including speckle variance OCT, phase variance OCT, optical microangiography, and split-spectrum microangiography.

Speckle variance OCT uses only the amplitude information of the complex OCT signal, whereas phase variance OCT uses only the phase information.

Optical microangiography computes flow using both components of the complex OCT signal.

Split-spectrum amplitude decorrelation angiography (SSADA) computes average decorrelation between consecutive B-scans to visualize blood flow.

== Methods ==
=== Imaging system ===
SV-OCT can be done with spectral domain OCT (SD-OCT) and swept source OCT (SS-OCT). SD-OCT and SS-OCT are both methods of Fourier domain OCT (FD-OCT), which has significantly faster image acquisition speed compared to time domain OCT. In general, OCT measures the echo time delay and intensity of reflected and backscattered light. A broad-bandwidth laser or superluminescent diode low-coherence light source travels to a beam splitter, which sends half of the light to the reference arm, which is at a known location, and half of the light to the sample, where it scatters and reflects off tissue. Light from the reference and sample arms recombine at the beam splitter, forming an interference pattern that is sensed by a photodetector. In SD-OCT, the interference pattern is split into its frequency components by a grating and are simultaneously detected by a charge-coupled device (CCD). Each frequency corresponds to a certain depth within the tissue. In SS-OCT, a tunable swept laser source is used.

=== Algorithm ===
The intensity or speckle of an OCT signal is the random interference pattern produced by backscattered light from a random medium. OCT captures cross-sectional images, known as B-scans. In SV-OCT, multiple B-scans are captured at the same location, creating a 3D data set, with time as the third dimension. The pixel-wise variance is computed between consecutive B-scan frames. A speckle variance image, $I_{SV}$ is calculated as

$I_{SV} = \frac{1}{N} \sum^N_{i=1} \left(I_{ijk} - \frac{1}{N} \sum^N_{i=1} I_{ijk} \right)^2 \qquad \quad (1)$

where ${N}$ is the number of B-scans obtained at a single location and $I_{ijk}$ is the intensity of a pixel with image coordinates $(j,k)$ in the B-scan indexed by $i$.

The speckle pattern of OCT images are affected by the motion of scattering particles in the target medium. The interference pattern produced by the signal of backscattered light through a medium depends on the movement of these particles. Therefore, the speckling pattern encapsulates information regarding the spatial and temporal motion of scattering particles in a random scattering medium. SV-OCT uses the inter-frame variance of image intensities to compute blood flow. Areas that have high flow will have higher motion of scattering particles and this information is encoded in the speckle pattern.

SV-OCT has advantages for microvasculature imaging due to its high sensitivity and independence to the Doppler angle. In addition, it has low computational complexity and requires relatively low data storage compared to PV-OCT. However, SV-OCT it is susceptible to bulk tissue motion and multiple scattering induced artifacts.

== Applications ==
SV-OCT has applications in the field of ophthalmology as several diseases affect blood flow in the eye. For example diabetic retinopathy (DR) can alter the structure of retinal capillaries and cause neovascularization, glaucoma is associated with lower retinal blood flow, age-related macular degeneration (AMD) is associated with choroidal neovascularization which can lead to loss of vision. SV-OCT has been used to image the microvasculature of the eye and study the pathophysiology of these diseases.

Aside from applications in ophthalmology, SV-OCT has been used to study blood flow in embryos, cardiac tissue, and spinal tissue
