= Serpiginous choroiditis =

- Other names: Geographic helicoid peripapillary choroidopathy
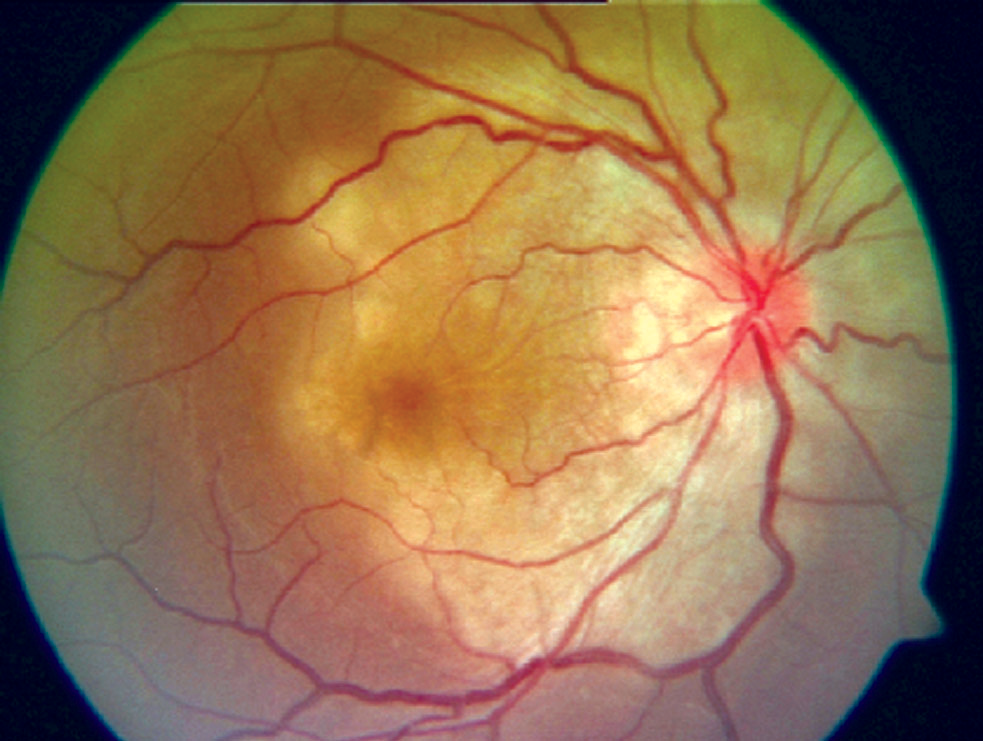
- Fundus image of serpiginous choroiditis
- Specialty: Ophthalmology

Serpiginous choroiditis, also known as geographic helicoid peripapillary choroidopathy (GHPC), is a rare, chronic, progressive, and recurrent bilateral inflammatory disease involving the retinal pigment epithelium (RPE), the choriocapillaries, and the choroid. It affects adult men and women equally in the second to seventh decades of life.

== Presentation ==
Serpiginous choroiditis is characterized acutely by irregular, gray-white or cream-yellow subretinal infiltrates at the level of the choriocapillaries and the RPE. Based on clinical presentation, it can be classified into peripapillary, macular, and ampiginous types. The clinical course, regardless of the presentation, is progressive, with multiple recurrences leading to potentially significant visual loss.

Patients present with unilateral or bilateral visual loss when the macula is involved and they may also notice photopsias and scotomatas. The anterior segment usually not involved, although Mild vitreous and anterior chamber inflammation is observed in one-third of the cases. Active lesions are usually found at the border of inactive lesions and appear in an interlocking polygonal pattern that spreads out peripherally from the optic nerve. Macular involvement is common.

Ampigenous choroiditis mimics placoid lesions of APMPPE and coalesced lesions of GHPC. Persistent placoid maculopathy is a resistant form of serpiginous choroidopathy and resembles macular GHPC, but differs in its clinical course and effect on visual acuity as a majority of the eyes develop CNVM, resulting in central vision loss. 10-12% can have macular involvement alone.

A closely related condition is multifocal serpiginoid choroiditis. This is caused by tuberculosis. The distinction between these two conditions is important as the latter responds to anti tuberculosis treatment while the former does not.

Choroidal neovascularization (CNV) is the most common complication associated with Serpiginous choroiditis.

== Treatment ==
It is crucial to initiate rapid and effective treatment to preserve retinal function. High-doses of intravenous pulse steroids can help preserve retinal function. Immunosuppressive agents can help lengthen periods of disease inactivity and reduce the risk of potential side effects associated with high-dose steroids.

== Sources ==
This article incorporates text from a free content work. Licensed under CC-BY-2.0. Text taken from Current approach in the diagnosis and management of posterior uveitis, S Sudharshan, Sudha K Ganesh, Jyotrimay Biswas, Indian Journal of Ophthalmology.
