= Acute posterior multifocal placoid pigment epitheliopathy =

Eye disease causing lesions in retina

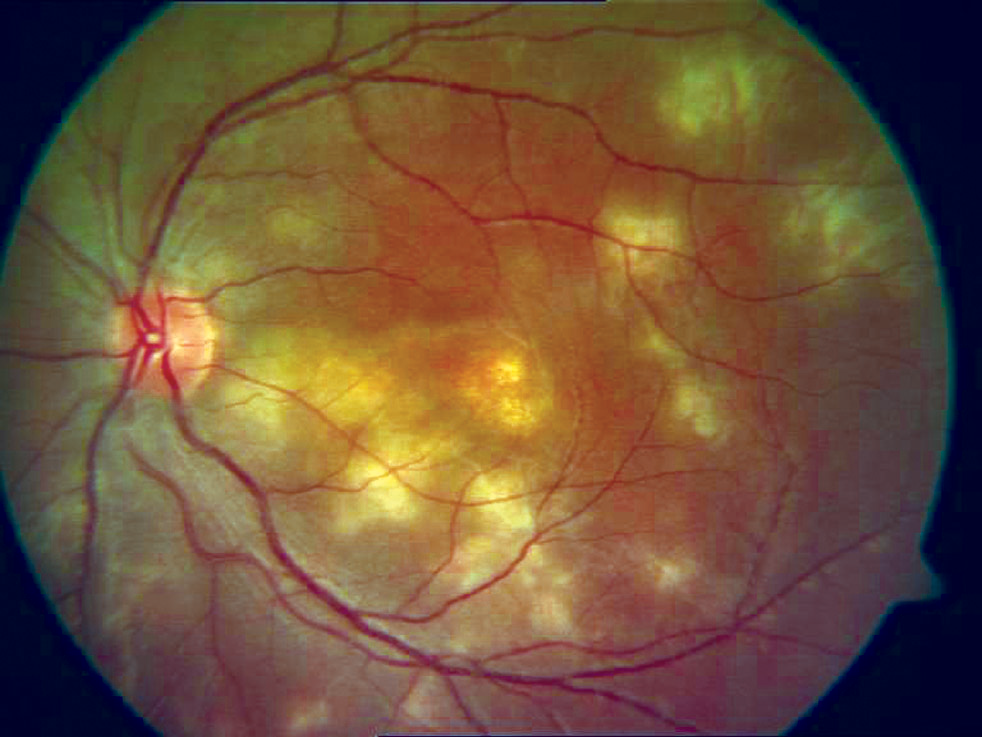
- Placoid lesions seen on fundal examination in APMPPE
- Specialty: Ophthalmology

Acute posterior multifocal placoid pigment epitheliopathy (APMPPE) is an acquired inflammatory uveitis that belongs to the heterogenous group of white dot syndromes in which light-coloured (yellowish-white) lesions form in the retina. Early in the course of the disease, the lesions cause acute and marked vision loss (if it interferes with the optic nerve) that ranges from mild to severe but is usually transient in nature. APMPPE is classified as an inflammatory disorder that is usually bilateral and acute in onset but self-limiting. The lesions leave behind some pigmentation, but visual acuity eventually improves even without any treatment (providing scarring doesn't interfere with the optic nerve).

It occurs equally between men and women with a male to female ratio of 1.2:1. Mean onset age is 27, but has been seen in people aged 16 to 40. It is known to occur after or concurrently with a systemic infection (but not always), showing that it is related generally to an altered immune system. Recurrent episodes can happen, but are extremely rare.

== Signs and symptoms ==
The onset of ocular symptoms are usually preceded by episode of viral or flu-like symptoms such as fever, cough or sore throat (however this is not always the case). Patients can typically present erythema nodosum, livedo reticularis, bilateral uveitis, and sudden onset of marked visual loss associated with the appearance of multiple lesions in the retina. These lesions may be colored from grey-white to cream-shaded yellow. Other symptoms include scotomata and photopsia. In weeks to a month times the lesions begin to clear and disappear (with prednisone) leaving behind areas of retinal pigment epithelial atrophy and diffuse fine pigmentation (scarring). Rarely choroidal neovascularization occur as a late onset complication.

== Cause ==
The cause of the inflammation remains unknown. It is hypothesized that it may occur as an autoimmune response to a mild infection, or it may be viral in nature, as evidenced by the preceding flu-like illness that generally accompanies it. It is associated with an increased incidence of both HLA-B7 and HLA-DR2.

The underlying etiology of APMPPE continues to cause debate. The term 'Pigment Epitheliopathy' was chosen by Gass to reflect what he thought was the tissue most significantly affected. Van Buskirk et al., and Deutman et al. proposed choriocapillaris ischemia as the more likely primary etiology. Indocyanine green angiography (ICGA), and OCT angiography (OCTA) studies have provided support for choriocapillaris involvement.

However, a novel hypothesis was proposed implicating a direct neurotropic infection as a possible underlying cause given the dynamic changes observed along the neuronal pathway of the retina

== Diagnosis ==
Diagnosis is usually made on clinical appearance alone on fundoscopy and/or retinal imaging. Supplementary tests such as Optical coherence tomography(OCT) and fundus fluorescein angiography/Indocyanine angiography together with OCT-Angiography are commonly performed to help aid diagnosis and monitoring. Fundus photography is useful to document the appearance of APMPPE lesions.

== Management ==
The original description categorized APMPPE as a self-limiting condition with a good prognosis, but the disease can be recurrent and result in significant visual loss. Owing to the self-limiting nature of the disease, treatment is generally not required. In cases where lesions appear to be interfering with the optic nerve, methyl prednisone is prescribed, but in recurrent disease an antimetabolite agent may be indicated.

== Prognosis ==
Vision improves in almost all cases. In rare cases, a patient may suffer permanent visual loss associated with lesions on their optic nerve.

Rarely, coexisting vasculitis may cause neurological complications. These occurrences can start with mild headaches that steadily worsen in pain and onset, and can include attacks of dysesthesia. This type of deterioration happens usually if the lesions involve the fovea.

== See also ==
- White dot syndromes
- Uveitis
