= Angioid streaks =

Fissures in Bruch's membrane within the eye's retina

- Bruch's membrane
- Specialty: Ophthalmology
- Complications: Loss of vision
- Diagnostic method: FFA, ICGA

Angioid streaks, also called Knapp streaks or Knapp striae, are small breaks in Bruch's membrane, an elastic tissue containing membrane of the retina that may become calcified and crack. Up to 50% of angioid streak cases are idiopathic. It may occur secondary to blunt trauma, or it may be associated with many systemic diseases. The condition is usually asymptomatic, but decrease in vision may occur due to choroidal neovascularization.

== Presentation ==
Angioid streaks are often associated with pseudoxanthoma elasticum, but have been found to occur in conjunction with other disorders, including Paget's disease, sickle cell disease and Ehlers–Danlos syndrome. These streaks can have a negative impact on vision due to choroidal neovascularization or choroidal rupture. Also, vision can be impaired if the streaks progress to the fovea and damage the retinal pigment epithelium.

== Diagnosis ==
The diagnosis is mainly clinical, however fundus fluorescein angiography shows that the streaks appear hyperfluorescent (window defect) in the early phase. Indocyanine green angiography can also be used for diagnosing angioid streaks and their associated ocular pathologies.

Retinal fundus examination may reveal grey or dark red spoke like lesions around optic disk and radiating outward from peripapillary area. Peau d'orange (orange skin), also known as leopard skin pattern may be seen in association with pseudoxanthoma elasticum. Optic disc drusen may also seen.

== Management ==
Management of angioid streaks starts with complete medical checkup to rule out underlying systemic associations. The condition is usually asymptomatic and at first do not need any treatment. Secondary ocular complications like choroidal neovascularization lead to vision loss, and/or metamorphopsia. If choroidal neovascularization is present, treatment options like anti-VEGF medication, laser photocoagulation, photodynamic therapy, transpupillary thermotherapy, macular translocation surgery etc. may be needed.

== History ==
They were first described by Robert Walter Doyne in 1889 in a patient with retinal hemorrhages. In 1892, ophthalmologist Hermann Jakob Knapp called them "angioid streaks" because of their resemblance to blood vessels. From histopathological research in the 1930s, they were discovered to be caused by changes at the level of Bruch's membrane. Presently, it is believed that its pathology may be a combination of elastic degeneration of Bruch's membrane, iron deposition in elastic fibers from hemolysis with secondary mineralization, and impaired nutrition due to stasis and small vessel occlusion.
