= List of adverse effects of nilotinib =

This is a list of adverse effects of the anti-cancer drug nilotinib, sorted by frequency of occurrence.

== Very common ==
Very common (>10% incidence) adverse effects include:

- Headache
- Nausea
- Hypophosphataemia
- Hyperbilirubinaemia
- Alanine aminotransferase (ALT) increased
- Aspartate aminotransferase increased
- Lipase increased
- Rash
- Itchiness
- Hair loss
- Dry skin
- Muscle aches
- Fatigue

== Common ==
Common (1–10% incidence) adverse effects include:

- Constipation
- Diarrhoea
- Vomiting
- Upper abdominal pain
- Indigestion
- Joint pain
- Muscle spasms
- Pain in extremities
- Asthenia
- Peripheral oedema
- Folliculitis
- Upper respiratory tract infection (including pharyngitis, nasopharyngitis, rhinitis)
- Skin papilloma
- Eosinophilia
- Lymphopenia
- Insomnia
- Anxiety
- Depression
- Diabetes mellitus
- Hypercholesterolaemia
- Hyperlipidaemia
- Hypertriglyceridaemia
- Hyperglycaemia
- Loss of appetite
- Dizziness
- Hypoaesthesia
- Peripheral neuropathy
- Eye pruritus
- Conjunctivitis
- Dry eye (including xerophthalmia)
- Vertigo
- Flushing
- Hypertension
- Angina pectoris
- Arrhythmia (including atrioventricular block, tachycardia, atrial fibrillation, ventricular extrasystoles, bradycardia)
- QT interval prolonged
- Palpitations
- Cough
- Dyspnoea
- Abdominal distension
- Abdominal discomfort
- Taste changes
- Flatulence
- Abnormal liver function
- Bone pain
- Back pain
- Erythema
- Hyperhidrosis
- Contusion
- Acne
- Dermatitis (including allergic, exfoliative and acneiform)
- Night sweats
- Fever without an infectious cause
- Chest pain (including non-cardiac chest pain)
- Chest discomfort
- Decreased haemoglobin
- Increased blood amylase
- Increased blood alkaline phosphatase
- Gamma-glutamyltransferase increased
- Weight increased
- Increased blood insulin
- Increased lipoprotein (including very low density and high density)

== Uncommon ==
Uncommon (0.1–1% incidence) adverse effects include:

- Arteriosclerosis
- Bone marrow suppression
- Both increases and decreases of potassium levels
- Body temperature change sensation (both hot and cold)
- Chills
- Cognitive deficits
- Conjunctival bleeding and redness
- Cyanosis
- Dental sensitivity to pain
- Bleeding into the lungs
- Increased blood cholesterol and lipid levels
- Dystonia
- Erectile dysfunction
- Eyelid swelling
- Flank pain
- Gastritis
- Gout
- Decreased calcium levels
- Jaundice
- Malaise
- Migraine
- Muscle pain and weakness
- Pancreatitis
- Paraesthesia
- Peripheral arterial occlusive disease
- Photopsia
- Pleural effusion
- Skin eruptions
- Skin pain
- Decreased globulins
