= Capillary lamina of choroid =

Part of the eye

Details

Identifiers
- Latin: Lamina choroidocapillaris
- TA98: A15.2.03.006
- FMA: 58437

The capillary lamina of choroid or choriocapillaris is a part of the choroid of the eye. It is a layer of capillaries immediately adjacent to Bruch's membrane of the choroid. The choriocapillaris consists of a dense network of freely anastomosing highly permeable fenestrated large-calibre capillaries. It nourishes the outer avascular layers of the retina.

== Structure ==
=== Microstructure ===
In the capillaries that compose the choriocapillaris, the fenestrations are densest at the aspect of the capillaries that faces retina, whereas pericytes are situated at the obverse aspect.

The choroidal blood vessels can be divided into two categories: the choriocapillaris, and the larger caliber arteries and veins that lie just posterior to the choriocapillaris (these can easily be seen in an albino fundus because there is minimal pigment obscuring the vessels). The choriocapillaris forms a single layer of anastomosing, fenestrated capillaries having wide lumina with most of the fenestrations facing toward the retina. The lumen is approximately three to four times that of ordinary capillaries, such that two or three red blood cells can pass through the capillary abreast, whereas in ordinary capillaries the cells usually course single file. The cell membrane is reduced to a single layer at the fenestrations, facilitating the movement of material through the vessel walls. Occasional (pericyte)s (Rouget cells), which may have a contractile function, are found around the capillary wall. Pericytes have the ability to alter local blood flow. The choriocapillaris is densest in the macular area, where it is the sole blood supply for a small region of the retina. The choriocapillaris is unique to the choroid and does not continue into the ciliary body.

== Function ==
The choriocapillaris serves multiple functions that include sustaining the photoreceptors, filtering waste produced in the outer retina and regulating the temperature of macula.

The capillary wall is permeable to plasma proteins which is probably of great importance for the supply of vitamin A to the pigment epithelium.

== History ==
The choriocapillaris was first described in man by Hovius in 1702, although it was not so named until 1838, by Eschricht. Passera (1896) described its form as star-shaped, radiating capillaries beneath the pigment epithelium of the retina, and Duke-Elder and Wybar (1961) have emphasized its nature as a network of capillaries in one plane.
