= Multiple evanescent white dot syndrome =

Inflammatory condition of the retina of the eye

- Specialty: Ophthalmology

Multiple evanescent white dot syndrome (MEWDS) is an uncommon inflammatory condition of the retina that typically affects otherwise healthy young females in the second to fourth decades of life.

The typical patient with MEWDS is a healthy female aged between 15 and 50. There is a gender disparity as women are affected with MEWDS four times more often than men. Roughly 30% of patients have experienced an associated viral prodrome. Patients present with acute, painless, unilateral change in vision.

== Presentation ==
Patients commonly present with acute unilateral painless decreased vision and photopsias. Presentations like central or paracentral scotoma, floaters and dyschromatopsia are less common. An antecedent viral prodrome occurs in approximately one-third of cases. Myopia is commonly seen in patients.

Eye exam during the acute phase of the disease reveals multiple discrete white to orange spots at the level of the RPE or deep retina, typically in a perifoveal location (around the fovea). Optic disc oedema may also seen occasionally.

== Cause ==
The etiology of multiple evanescent white dot syndrome is currently unknown but two potential origins have been postulated. Gass, et al. suggests a virus invades retinal photoreceptors through cell-to-cell transmission via either the ora serrata or optic disc margin. Alternatively, Jampol, et al. proposes an auto-immune origin in patients with certain genetic vulnerabilities to environmental triggers. More recently, MEWDS may be associated with the SARS COVID-19 Pfizer vaccine but more studies are needed. It has been seen in one case of COVID-19 infection.

== Diagnosis ==
- Visual field abnormalities are variable and include generalized depression of visual field, paracentral or peripheral scotoma and enlargement of the blind spot.
- Fluorescein angiography of the eye reveals characteristic punctate hyperfluorescent lesions in a wreath-like configuration surrounding the fovea.
- Indocyanine green angiography reveals hypofluorescent lesions in a greater number compared with other studies.
- Fundus autofluorescence (FAF) has been shown to be a noninvasive method to demonstrate the subretinal spots in MEWDS.

== Treatment ==
MEWDS is a self limited disease with excellent visual recovery within 2-10 weeks. However residual symptoms including photopsia may persist for months.
