= Erythrokeratodermia =

- Specialty: Dermatology

Erythrokeratodermia is a group of keratinization disorders.

Types include:

- Erythrokeratodermia variabilis
- Erythrokeratodermia with ataxia
- Progressive symmetric erythrokeratodermia
