= Retinaldehyde-binding protein 1 =

Protein-coding gene in the species Homo sapiens

RLBP1
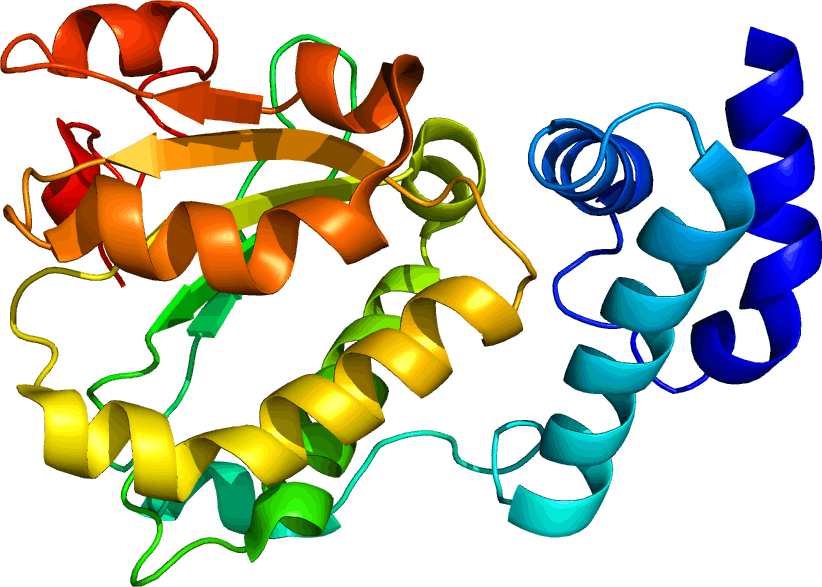

Identifiers
- Aliases: RLBP1, CRALBP, retinaldehyde binding protein 1
- External IDs: OMIM: 180090; MGI: 97930; GeneCards: RLBP1
Available structures
PDB	Ortholog search: PDBe RCSB
PDB	List of PDB id codes 3HX3, 3HY5, 4CIZ, 4CJ6

Gene location (Human)
Chr.	Chromosome 15 (human)
Band	15q26.1	Start	89,209,869 bp
Band	15q26.1	End	89,221,614 bp

Gene location (Mouse)
Chr.	Chromosome 7 (mouse)
Band	7 D2|7 45.0 cM	Start	79,024,618 bp
Band	7 D2|7 45.0 cM	End	79,036,796 bp
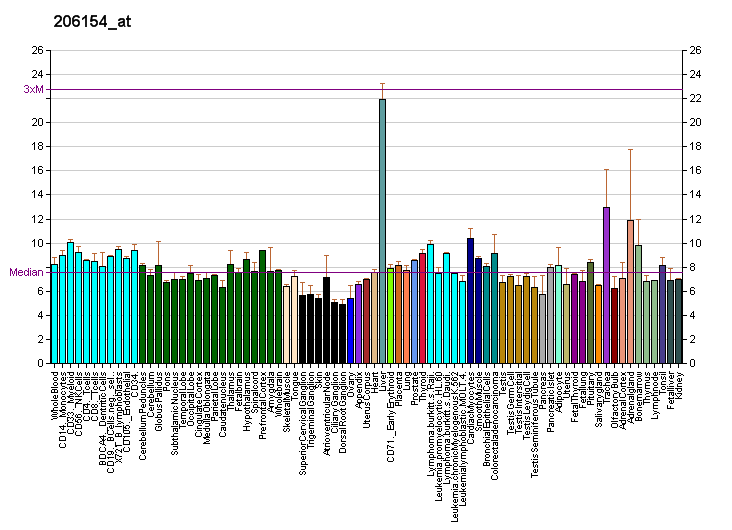
RNA expression pattern
Bgee	Human / Mouse (ortholog); Top expressed in: retinal pigment epithelium; choroid; testicle; caudate nucleus; putamen; right frontal lobe; Brodmann area 9; cingulate gyrus; anterior cingulate cortex; amygdala / Top expressed in: retinal pigment epithelium; neural layer of retina; ventricular zone; ciliary body; iris; Rostral migratory stream; utricle; stria vascularis; vestibular sensory epithelium; ganglionic eminence; More reference expression data
BioGPS	More reference expression data
Gene ontology
Molecular function	retinal binding; 11-cis retinal binding; retinol binding
Cellular component	cytosol; cell body; cytoplasm; cellular component
Biological process	retinoid metabolic process; response to stimulus; vitamin A metabolic process; visual perception
Sources:Amigo / QuickGO
Orthologs
Databases	NCBI: entry; OMA: entry
Species	Human	Mouse
Entrez	6017	19771
Ensembl	ENSG00000140522	ENSMUSG00000039194
UniProt	P12271	Q9Z275
RefSeq (mRNA)	NM_000326	NM_001173483; NM_020599; NM_001357450
RefSeq (protein)	NP_000317	NP_001166954; NP_065624; NP_001344379
Location (UCSC)	Chr 15: 89.21 – 89.22 Mb	Chr 7: 79.02 – 79.04 Mb
PubMed search
- Wikidata
View/Edit Human	View/Edit Mouse

Retinaldehyde-binding protein 1 (RLBP1) also known as cellular retinaldehyde-binding protein (CRALBP) is a 36-kD water-soluble protein that in humans is encoded by the RLBP1 gene.

== Discovery ==
Cellular retinol binding protein (CRBP) was first discovered in 1973 from lung tissues by Bashor et al. There have been three cellular retinol binding protein categories discovered; Cellular retinol-binding protein, cellular retinoic acid-binding protein and cellular retinaldehyde-binding protein(CRALBP). CRALBP was first discovered in 1977, after it was purified from retina and retinal pigment epithelial cells.

== Function ==
The cellular retinaldehyde-binding protein transports 11-cis-retinal (also known as 11-cis-retinaldehyde) as its physiological ligands. It plays a critical role as an 11-cis-retinal acceptor which facilitates the enzymatic isomerization of all 11-trans-retinal to 11-cis-retinal, in the isomerization of the rod and cones of the visual cycle.

== Tissue distribution ==
CRALBP is not just found in retina and retinal pigment epithelial cells, but also expressed in other cell types. It is majorly found in the iris, cornea, ciliary epithelium, Muller cells, the pineal gland and oligodendrocytes of the optic nerve and brain. This protein is also found in other tissues than the aforementioned ones, however its function in cells not related to the eyes are not yet known

== Clinical significance ==
When a visual pigment molecule in photoreceptors of mammalian rod and cone cells are triggered by photons of light, the pigment molecule is unable to detect an ensuing photon of light. All the retinal molecules in the chromophore of the visual pigment molecule, exist in the 11-trans-retinal state after stimulation by photons. RLBP1 helps in converting the 11-trans-retinal to the light sensitive 11-cis retinal. This process is a part of the visual cycle, which involves the expulsion of all 11-trans-retinal containing chromophores out of photoreceptors, and subsequent conversion to the 11-cis-retinal state in retinal pigment epithelial cells, for both rod and cone cells. The 11-cis chromophore is then signalled back into photoreceptor cells, where it undergoes fusion with a free opsin molecule to regenerate the visual pigment.

== Gene location ==
The RLBP1 gene is located on human chromosome 15, specifically on 15q26. This gene was formerly believed to have 8 exons and 7 introns. However, Vogel et al. demonstrated that there are actually 8 introns on that chromosome. A gene element, upstream of the previously thought exon 1 was originally thought to be an enhancer. In reality, this assumed enhancer is the main promoter for this gene. The newly discovered intron 1 lies within and just near the end of the promoter region of RLBP1 gene.

== Mutations and associated diseases ==
Mutations of RLBP1 include several diseases associated with vision. All of these are autosomal recessive including Bothnia dystrophy, retinitis punctata albescens, retinitis pigmentosa, Newfoundland rod-cone dystrophy and fundus albipunctatus. The characteristics of the associated diseases vary with age, severity and rate of progression. These all have similar qualities such as, photoreceptor deterioration and slower dark adaptation, ultimately leading to visual impairment, often leading to complete blindness.

=== Bothnia dystrophy ===
People suffering from Bothnia dystrophy have a homozygous C to T base pair substitution in exon 7 of the RLBP1 gene. This leads to a missense mutation from Arginine to Tryptophan at the 234 position of the RLBP1.

=== Retinitis punctata albescens and fundus albipunctatus ===
Katsanis et al. showed that a homozygous alteration from Arginine to Glutamine amino acid expression, at the 150 position on RLBP1, brings about the onset of retinitis punctata albescens and or fundus albipunctatus.
