= Moore's lightning streaks =

Moore's lightning streaks are lightning type streaks (photopsia) (seen to the temporal side) due to sudden head or eye movement in the dark. They are generally caused by shock waves in the vitreous humor hitting the retina or traction on the retina from fibers in the vitreous humor. The implication is that the vitreous is softer than normal, generally this is not a cause for alarm provided they are momentary, occur only in the dark, are due to sudden head movements (acceleration) and do not occur along with many new tiny black floating specks in the vision. Professional advice should be sought in cases of doubt, as retinal detachment, a serious condition, also can cause flashes in the eye.

They are named after Robert Foster Moore (1878–1963), a British ophthalmologist.
