= North Carolina macular dystrophy =

- Other names: Dominant Progressive Foveal Dystrophy of Lefler, Wadsworth and Sidbury
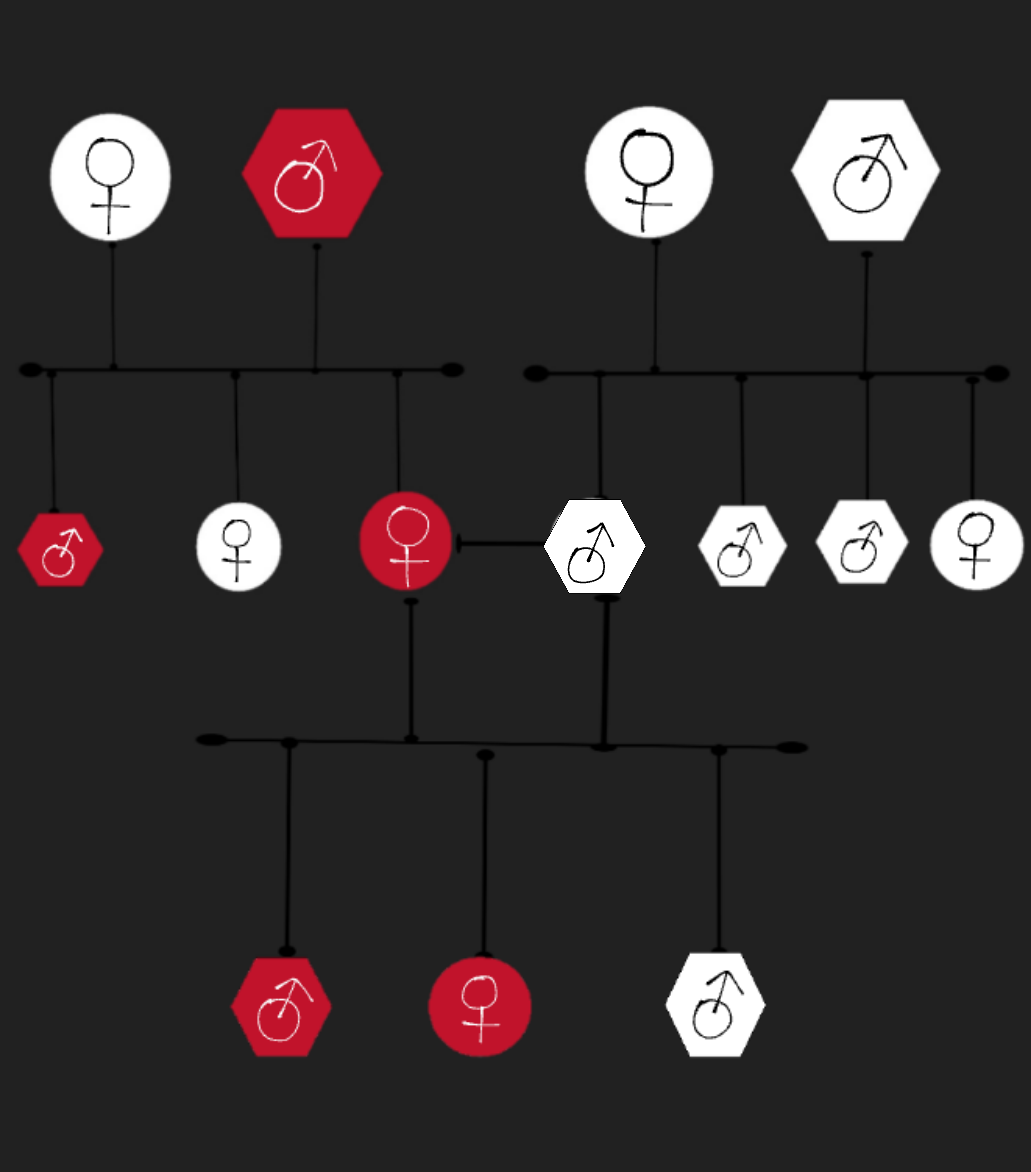
- This disorder is inherited in an autosomal dominant fashion.
- Symptoms: central vision loss and congenital and non-progressive ocular abnormalities
- Complications: Blindness
- Usual onset: Birth
- Duration: Life-long
- Causes: Genetic mutation
- Risk factors: Having at least one parent with the disorder
- Frequency: Rare

North Carolina macular dystrophy is an extremely rare autosomal dominant genetic disorder that primarily affects the eyes. It is a non-progressive disorder which is characterized by an abnormal development of the macula, multiple drusen, photoreceptor cells atrophy, and central vision loss. This condition is caused by mutations in chromosome 6q16

This disease was named after the U.S. state North Carolina due to the fact that the first people to be diagnosed with this disorder were members of a four-generation Irish-American family in North Carolina, since then, Latin American, European, and Asian families have been reported in medical literature to have this disorder as well.
