= Karl Wilhelm Ludwig Bruch =

German anatomist

Karl Wilhelm Ludwig Bruch (May 1, 1819 – January 4, 1884) was a German anatomist born in Mainz.

In 1842 he earned his medical doctorate from the University of Giessen, and in 1845 he received his habilitation with a dissertation on rigor mortis called Nonnulla de Rigore Mortis. In 1850 he was appointed professor of anatomy and physiology at the University of Basel, and in 1855 returned to Giessen as a professor.

In 1855 he published "Über die Befruchtung des thierischen Eies und über die histologische Deutung desselben" ("On the fertilization of animal eggs and its histological interpretation").

== Associated eponyms ==
- "Bruch's glands": Lymph nodes located in the palpebral conjunctiva. Sometimes referred to as trachoma glands.
- "Bruch's membrane": Innermost layer of the choroid.
