= Familial exudative vitreoretinopathy =

Retinal vascular disease

- Diagram of the human eye. The retina is the layer of tissue at the back of the eye that receives light and converts it into a signal which travels along the optic nerve to be processed into visual perception by the brain.
- Specialty: Ophthalmology

Familial exudative vitreoretinopathy (FEVR, pronounced as fever) is a genetic disorder affecting the growth and development of blood vessels in the retina of the eye. This disease can lead to visual impairment and sometimes complete blindness in one or both eyes. FEVR is characterized by incomplete vascularization of the peripheral retina. This can lead to the growth of new blood vessels which are prone to leakage and hemorrhage and can cause retinal folds, tears, and detachments. Treatment involves laser photocoagulation of the avascular portions of the retina to reduce new blood vessel growth and risk of complications including leakage of retinal blood vessels and retinal detachments.

== Genetics ==
There have been several gene mutations associated with FEVR. These genes code for proteins involved in the WNT signaling pathway, which is involved in the development of the human eye and regulation of blood vessel growth. Depending on the genes involved, FEVR can follow an autosomal dominant, autosomal recessive, or X-linked inheritance pattern. There is varying penetrance and expressivity depending on the genes involved. While genetic testing may be useful in the diagnosis of FEVR, a negative genetic test does not rule out the disease.

== Pathophysiology ==
FEVR is caused by genetic defects involving the regulation of blood vessel growth in developing eyes. As a result, there is poor blood vessel growth to the periphery of the retina. The lack of blood supply to the peripheral retina triggers the release of molecules that stimulate blood vessel growth, such as vascular endothelial growth factor (VEGF). However, this new blood vessel growth, also known as neovascularization, can lead to further complications such as the leakage and hemorrhage of retinal blood vessels, retinal tears, and detachments.

== Diagnosis ==
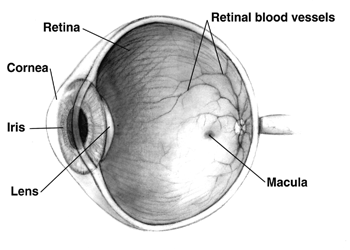
Familial exudative vitreoretinopathy involves the improper growth and development of the blood vessels in the retina.

Diagnosis of FEVR is often made through direct visualization of the retina and fluorescein angiography, along with personal and family medical history. Hallmark characteristics of FEVR include lack of blood vessels in the peripheral retina. Other findings may include vessel and macular dragging, sub-retinal exudates, neovascularization, retinal folds, and retinal detachments. FEVR must be differentiated from other diseases involving incomplete vascularization of the retina including retinopathy of prematurity (ROP), Norrie disease, Coat's disease, and others. Severity of disease is highly variable and can range from mild visual impairment to complete vision loss. Based on the severity of the disease, FEVR is diagnosed based on a clinical staging scale from 1 to 5. Since FEVR often runs in families, immediate relatives of someone diagnosed with FEVR should be examined by an ophthalmologist because the disease can have no symptoms before complications arise including retinal detachments.

== Treatment ==
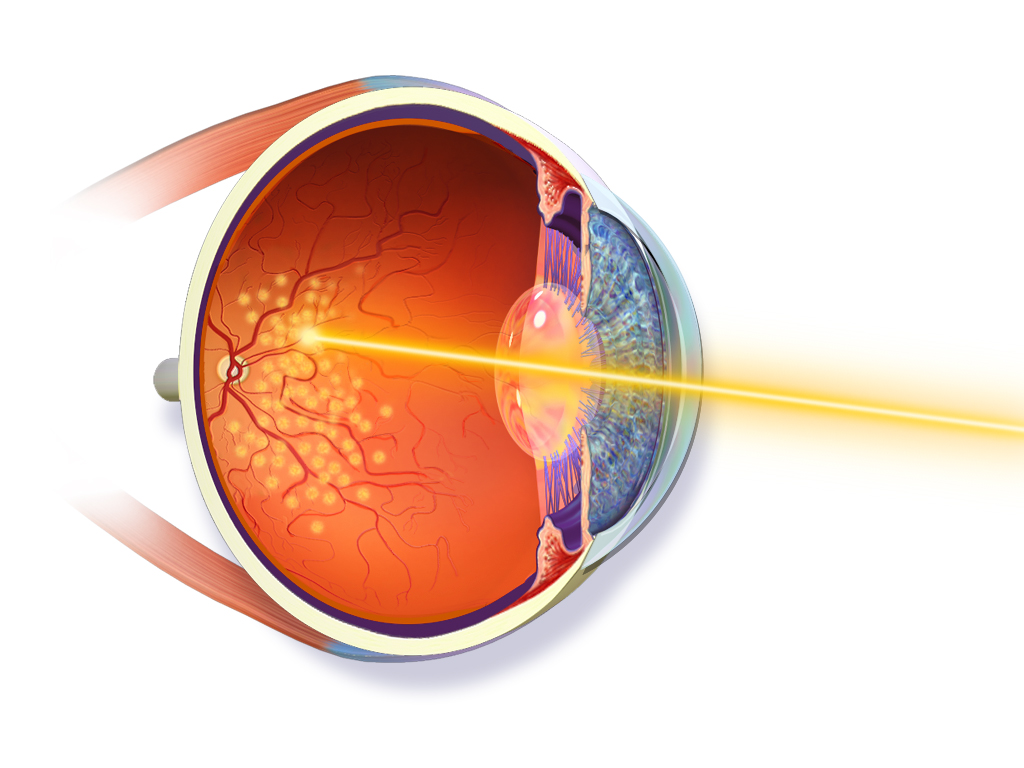
Laser photocoagulation involves using a laser to cauterize the portions of retina which are not supplied by blood vessels.

Treatment is largely aimed at reducing the amount of new blood vessel growth and preventing complications that may arise as a result, including retinal tears and detachments. Using a laser, an ophthalmologist burns the portions of the retina that are not supported by blood vessels, a technique known as laser photocoagulation.

By doing so, this tissue will no longer release molecules that stimulate blood vessel growth. If a retinal detachment occurs, laser therapy or surgery may be required to repair the retina.
