= Eschricht =

Eschricht is a surname. Notable people with the surname include:

- Daniel Frederik Eschricht (1798-1863), Danish zoologist
- Robert Eschricht (born 1985), German politician
