= Macular scarring =

Macular scarring is formation of the fibrous tissue in place of the normal retinal tissue on the macular area of the retina which provides the sharpest vision in the eyes. It is usually a result of an inflammatory or infectious process. Other etiologies include macular pucker (macular detachment), macular hole, and age-related macular degeneration. Macular dystrophies and telangiectasia are among the less common causes.
