= Drusen =

Accumulations of extracellular material in the retina

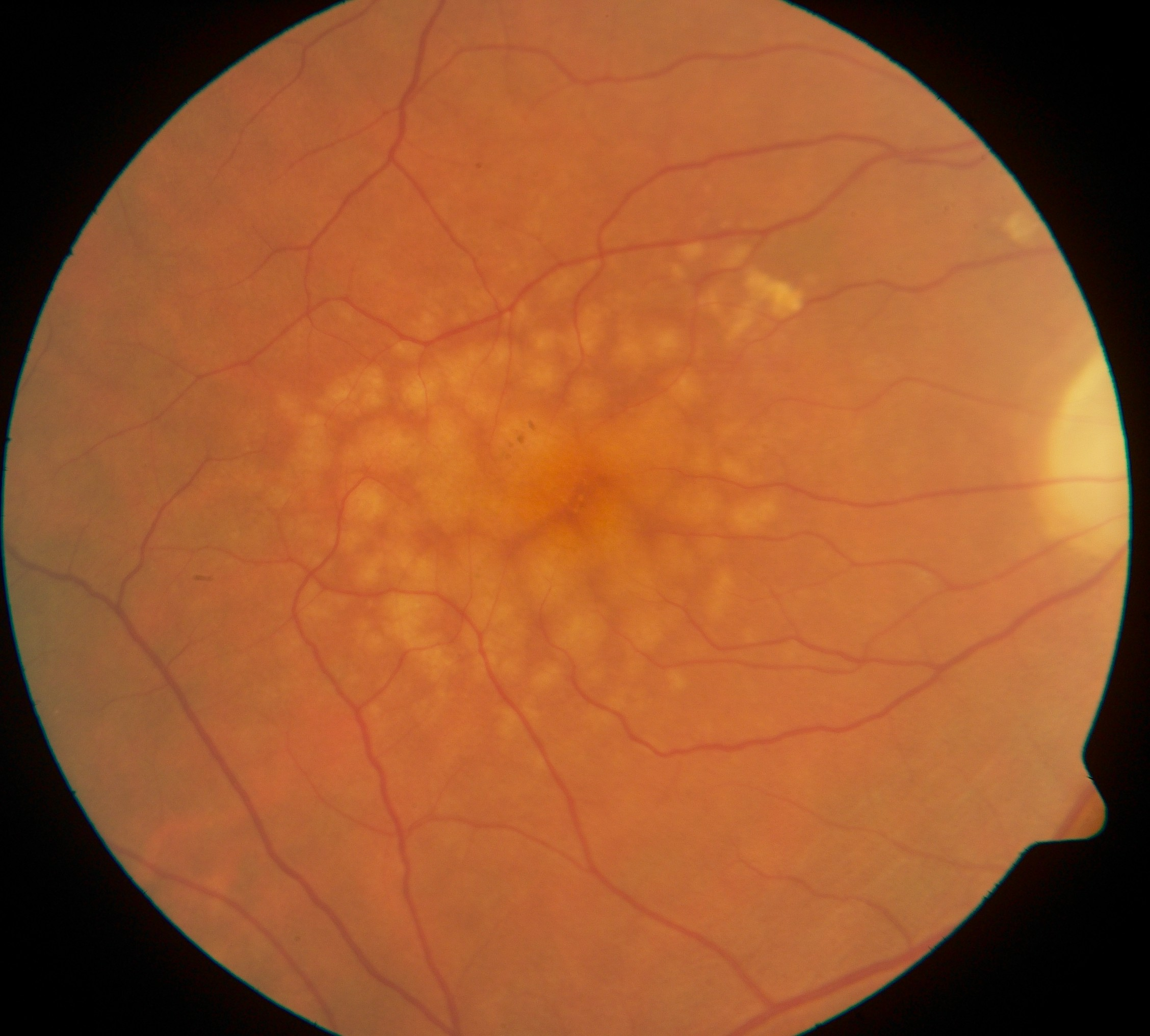
- Macular soft drusen in the right eye of a 70-year-old male.
- Specialty: Ophthalmology

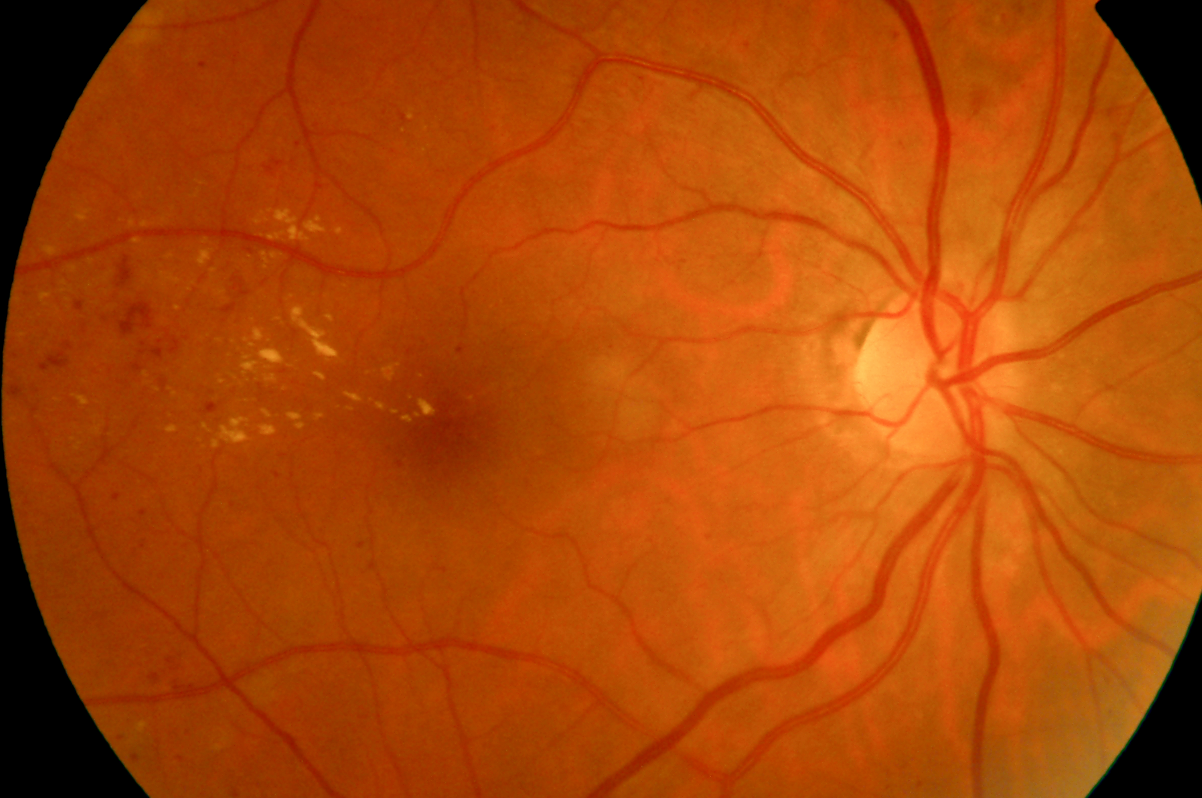
Macular hard drusen and hard exudates in the right eye of a 65-year-old diabetic woman

Drusen, from the German word for node or geode (singular, "Druse"), are tiny yellow or white accumulations of extracellular material that build up between Bruch's membrane and the retinal pigment epithelium of the eye. The presence of a few small ("hard") drusen is normal with advancing age, and most people over 40 have some hard drusen. However, the presence of larger and more numerous drusen in the macula is a common early sign of age-related macular degeneration (AMD).

== Classification ==
Drusen associated with aging and macular degeneration are distinct from another clinical entity, optic disc drusen, which is present on the optic nerve head. Both age-related drusen and optic disc drusen can be observed by ophthalmoscopy. Optical coherence tomography scans of the orbits or head, calcification at the head of the optic nerve without change in size of globe strongly suggests drusen in a middle-aged or elderly patient.

Whether drusen promote AMD or are symptomatic of an underlying process that causes both drusen and AMD is not known, but they are indicators of increased risk of the complications of AMD.

Hard drusen may coalesce into soft drusen, which is a manifestation of macular degeneration.

== Pathophysiology ==
In view of their location between the retinal pigment epithelium (RPE) and its vascular supply, the choriocapillaris, it is possible that drusen deprive the RPE and photoreceptor cells of oxygen and nutrients. In some cases, drusen develop above the so-called pillars of the choriocapillaris that is the area between two micro vessels; although important variations are observed between different subtypes of AMD.

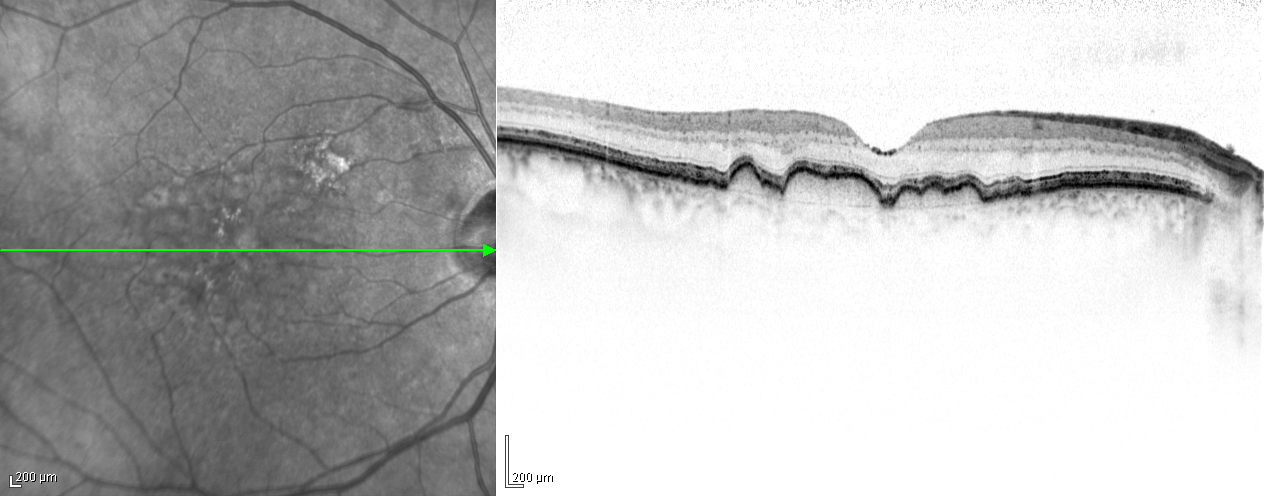
Drusen in optical coherence tomography.

The source of the proteins and lipids in drusen is also not clear, with potential contributions by both the RPE and the choroid. Several trace elements are present in drusen, probably the most concentrated being zinc. The protein composition of drusen includes apolipoproteins and oxidized proteins, likely originating from blood, RPE, and photoreceptors. Drusen composition also includes members of the complement system. Zinc in drusen has been suggested to play a role in drusen formation by precipitating and inhibiting the elements of the complement cascade, especially complement factor H.

The presence of molecules that regulate inflammation in drusen has led some investigators to conclude that these deposits are a product of the immune system.

== Diagnosis ==
Usually being asymptomatic, drusen are typically found during routine eye exams where the pupils have been dilated.

== Treatment ==
Laser treatment of drusen has been studied. While it is possible to eliminate drusen with this treatment strategy, it has been shown that this fails to reduce the risk of developing the choroidal neovascularisation which causes the blindness associated with age-related macular degeneration.

== History ==
Around 1850, three authors, Carl Wedl, Franciscus Donders, and Heinrich Müller, gave drusen different labels. Drusen, the hallmark of AMD, were first described in 1854 by Wedl. Wedl named them colloid bodies of the choroid and thought that they were incompletely developed cells. Franciscus Donders called them "Colloidkugeln" (colloid spheres). Later, Heinrich Müller named them by the German word for geode, based on their glittering appearance. He was convinced that drusen originated from the nuclei of the pigment cells, which he believed to belong to the choroid.

== See also ==
- Optic disc drusen

== Notes ==
- Mishra, S; Goel, S; Roy, SS; Garg, B; Parvin, M; Saurabh, K; Roy, R (January 2019). "Multimodal imaging characteristics of refractile drusen". Indian Journal of Ophthalmology. 67 (1): 128–129. doi:10.4103/ijo.IJO_867_18. PMC 6324114. PMID 30574912.
