= Enolase deficiency =

- Specialty: Endocrinology

Enolase deficiency is a rare genetic disorder of glucose metabolism. Partial deficiencies have been observed in several caucasian families. The deficiency is transmitted through an autosomal dominant inheritance pattern. The gene for enolase 1 has been localized to chromosome 1 in humans. Enolase deficiency, like other glycolytic enzyme deficiences, usually manifests in red blood cells as they rely entirely on anaerobic glycolysis. Enolase deficiency is associated with a spherocytic phenotype and can result in hemolytic anemia, which is responsible for the clinical signs of Enolase deficiency.

== Symptoms and signs ==
Symptoms of enolase deficiency include exercise-induced myalgia and generalized muscle weakness and fatigability, both with onset in adulthood. Symptoms also include muscle pain without cramps, and decreased ability to sustain long term exercise.

== Causes ==
Genetics is found to be the cause of enolase deficiency. The individual in the first known case of this deficiency was heterozygous for the gene for β-enolase, and carried two missense mutations, one inherited from each parent. His muscle cells synthesized two forms of β-enolase, each carrying a different mutation. These mutations changed glycine at position 374 to glutamate (G374E) and glycine at position 156 to aspartate (G156D).

== Pathophysiology ==
The enolase enzyme catalyzes the conversion of 2-phosphoglycerate to phosphoenolpyruvate; this is the ninth step in glycolysis. Enolase is a dimeric protein formed from three subunits, α, β, and γ, encoded by different genes. The αα homodimer assumes all enolase activity in the early stages of embryo development and in some adult tissues. In tissues that need large amounts of energy, the αγ and γγ in the brain, and αβ and ββ in striated muscles these forms of enolase are present. At all stages of development, β-enolase expression is only found in striated muscles. In adult humans, the ββ homodimer accounts for more than 90% of total enolase activity in muscle.

Two mutations in the ENO3 gene, the gene encoding β-enolase, is responsible for the deficiency, both mutations changed highly conserved amino acid residues. One of the changes was of a glycine residue at position 374 to aspartate, this amino acid change was located in close proximity to the His residue of human enolase, which is an important part of the β-enolase catalytic site, while the glycine at position 156 changed to glutamate, which may have brought about change the secondary structure of the enzyme. These mutations may impair activity by significantly reducing the steady- state level of the protein, rather than produce a non- functional mutant protein. Mutations of the β-enolase dimer complexes might result in incorrect folding and increased susceptibility to protein degradation thus causing the deficiency.

Similar mutations on yeast showed destabilization of the protein and decreased substrate affinity. Destabilization of the protein results in partial dissociation, some researchers propose that in muscle cells this dissociation may be perceived as an abnormality leading to degradation of the mutated enolase.
