= Erythroblastopenia =

Erythroblastopenia (a decrease of red blood cells in a complete blood count) may refer to:

- Acquired pure red cell aplasia
- Transient erythroblastopenia of childhood

== See also ==
- Polycythemia
- Anemia
