= Pacman dysplasia =

Medical condition

Pacman dysplasia, also known as Epiphyseal stippling syndrome or Osteoclastic hyperplasia syndrome, is a lethal autosomal recessive skeletal dysplasia that affects our primary bones; It has impacted from 10 - 1,000 people globally and in the United States; it does not currently have any known cure. Pacman dysplasia occurs as a result of the occurrence of genetic mutations and can be linked to the COL2A1 gene and the PLS3 gene. Primary bones can be defined as those that are first formed during our development or after damage to a bone is beginning to be repaired. Pacman dysplasia seems to affect babies during pregnancy or when they are first born. The most common symptoms include, abnormal bone ossification, abnormal calvaria (skullcap) morphology, epiphysial stippling and the bowing and/or curvature of long bones.

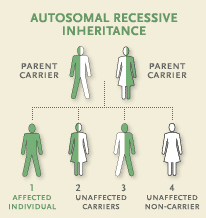
An autosomal recessive mode of inheritance is possible when both parents are carriers of the affected gene.

== Autosomal Recessive Inheritance Pattern ==
An autosomal allele is one that is not located on the x or y chromosomes. When a gene is inherited in an autosomal manner, a child needs to receive 1 copy of the affected allele from both parents. Only when a child has inherited 2 affected alleles will the effect be seen visibly in the phenotype. If the child has only inherited one affected allele, the phenotype will be masked.

== Who does Pacman Dysplasia Affect ==
The symptoms of Pacman dysplasia begin to appear / become visible during pregnancy and when the affected child is a newborn.

== Some symptoms that are seen and their relative abundance ==
Symptoms	Example/Description	Frequency/Abundance (%)
Epiphysial Stippling	Calcifications toward the end part of the bone.	80-99 (Frequent)
Lethal Skeletal Dyaplasia	Such as lethal dwarfism that can be identified when an affected child is born.	80-99(Frequent)
Hypotelorism	Decreased interpupillary distance or eyes that are close together	80-99(Frequent)
Genu Varum	Legs are bowed outward	80-99 (Frequent)
Bowing of long bones	Long bones, such as those in the arms and legs, are bowed	(% not available) (Frequent)
Abnormal calvaria morphology	Structural morphology is abnormal	80-99 (Frequent)
Abnormal Bone Ossification	Anomaly that occurs when bone is formed or when fibrous tissue / cartilage becomes bone.	(% not available) (Frequent)

== How many people have been affected ==
It is believed that 1:100,000 are affected with Pacman dysplasia. Most cases of Pacman dysplasia will likely go undiagnosed. In terms of the effects in the United States, Pacman dysplasia impacts or is believed to have impacted fewer than 1000 people.

== Cases ==
Due to the rarity of the disorder, there are not many described cases of Pacman Dysplasia. One example of the few recorded cases of Pacman Dysplasia was observed and recorded in 1993. This case features a male fetus that was terminated at an estimated gestational age of 24 weeks with symptoms that include shortening and bowing of long bones, epiphysial puncta (calcifications of cartilage often present at the ends of bones), and periosteal cloaking. The pregnancy was terminated because skeletal dysplasia was suspected and later confirmed with postmortem imaging of the fetus.

== Cure and Treatment ==
As is the case with many rare diseases, Pacman dysplasia takes a while to diagnose. This is due to both to the rarity of the disease and the lack of knowledge and education people may have about the disease. As of now, there is no known cure that has been created to treat Pacman dysplasia, but treatment options to help target and improve its various symptoms are available.
