= Vertebrobasilar insufficiency =

- Specialty: Neurology

Vertebrobasilar insufficiency (VBI) describes a temporary set of symptoms due to decreased blood flow (ischemia) in the posterior circulation of the brain. The posterior circulation supplies the medulla, pons, midbrain, cerebellum and (in 70-80% of people) supplies the posterior cerebellar artery to the thalamus and occipital cortex. As a result, symptoms vary widely depending which brain region is predominantly affected.

The term 'vertebrobasilar insufficiency' may be used to describe disease in the vertebral and basilar arteries which predisposes to acute embolic events such as transient ischemic attacks (TIAs) and stroke. Alternatively it may be used to describe recurrent symptoms which result from narrowing (stenosis) of these arteries in combination with changes of blood pressure or head position.

VBI should not be confused with other conditions which may relate to the posterior circulation. 25% of strokes and TIAs affect parts of the brain supplied by the posterior circulation, but many of these are embolic from cardiac or other sources. VBI should also not be confused with beauty parlour syndrome which refers to strokes caused by acute arterial dissection brought on by extreme head positions, such as those maintained during hair washing.

== Signs and symptoms ==
Symptoms relate to impaired brain function in areas supplied by the posterior circulation, as seen in posterior circulation strokes. However, symptoms may be far briefer than those seen in stroke.

Vertigo is a relatively common symptom that can result from ischemia to the cerebellum, medulla or (rarely) the internal auditory artery which supplies the vestibular system of the inner ear. While vertigo is a common feature of VBI or posterior circulation stroke, VBI only rarely presents with vertigo alone (without other neurological signs).

== Pathology ==
VBI results from narrowing of posterior circulation arteries, known as stenosis. The most common cause of arterial stenosis is atherosclerosis, however other pathologies such as fibromuscular dysplasia, dissection, trauma or external compression may occur. Atherosclerotic plaque can rupture, resulting in a source of emboli. These emboli can cause TIAs or strokes in the areas of the brain supplied by the affected artery.

Where stenosis is severe, abrupt changes in blood pressure can temporarily result in inadequate flow through the stenosis, causing symptoms that are usually very brief. A common cause is orthostatic hypotension which results in a fall in blood pressure when the patient changes posture and may be exacerbated by medicines (particularly antihypertensives), dehydration and heat. In reality, orthostatic hypotension can cause vague symptoms (e.g. dizziness) which are similar to those caused by VBI; VBI should only be considered where the stenosis is severe and/or there are focal neurological symptoms specific to the posterior circulation.

VBI may also result from altered blood flow as seen in subclavian steal syndrome.

VBI is described as a cause of symptoms that occur with changes to head position. Rotational vertebral artery syndrome (sometimes referred to as Bow Hunter's Syndrome) results from vertebral artery compression on rotating the neck. The commonest cause is a bone spur from a cervical vertebra, in combination with disease in the opposite vertebral artery. Rotational vertebral artery syndrome is rare.

== Diagnosis ==
The diagnosis of posterior circulation stroke or TIA can be made on the basis of history and physical examination, which should include exclusion of alternative causes for the patient's symptoms and consideration of risk factors for atherosclerosis. To confirm VBI, imaging studies of the posterior circulation can be performed. CT is often the first study performed in acute stroke or TIA, as it is effective at excluding intracranial haemorrhage, however MRI is better at detecting ischemic strokes in the posterior distribution. CT angiography and Magnetic Resonance Angiography (MRA) can be used to detect atherosclerosis and other diseases in the posterior circulation arteries. Both can over-estimate stenosis.

Atherosclerosis is a common finding, and its presence does not confirm that this was the cause of the patient's symptoms.

=== Alternative diagnoses ===
VBI is often considered when a patient complains of dizziness. It is important to distinguish dizziness caused by vertigo from the sensation of being light-headed, as the latter is more commonly a result of other conditions.

Brief episodes of vertigo brought on by head movements are more likely to be Benign paroxysmal positional vertigo. Alternatively, carotid sinus hypersensitivity can cause episodes of dizziness and collapse on head turning if the neck brushes against clothing.

== Treatment ==
The main treatment for VBI is to address risk factors for atherosclerosis such as smoking, hypertension and diabetes. Patients are often started on an antiplatelet (e.g. aspirin, clopidogrel) or occasionally an anticoagulant (e.g. warfarin) to reduce the risk of future strokes. Where VBI is causing reproducible symptoms due to stenosis, lifestyle modification to avoid provoking factors (e.g. dehydration, standing rapidly from sitting or lying) may reduce symptoms.

Open surgical repair or stenting can be performed to re-open stenosed vertebral arteries, and intracranial stents have also been successfully used. Further research is required to determine which patients with VBI are likely to benefit.
