= Ekbom syndrome =

Ekbom syndrome may refer to:

- Delusional parasitosis
- Wittmaack–Ekbom disease, or restless legs syndrome (outdated usage)
