= Indocyanine green angiography =

Diagnostic procedure

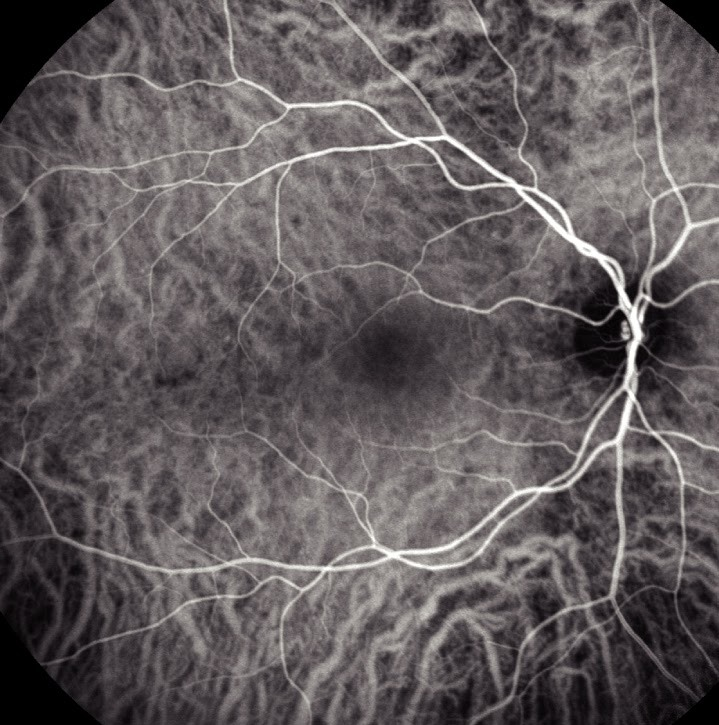
- Choroidal blood flow revealed with indocyanine green angiography
- ICD-9-CM: 95.11

Indocyanine green angiography (ICGA) is a diagnostic procedure used to examine choroidal blood flow and associated pathology. Indocyanine green (ICG) is a water soluble cyanine dye which shows fluorescence in near-infrared (790–805 nm) range, with peak spectral absorption of 800-810 nm in blood. The near infrared light used in ICGA penetrates ocular pigments such as melanin and xanthophyll, as well as exudates and thin layers of sub-retinal vessels. Age-related macular degeneration is the third main cause of blindness worldwide, and it is the leading cause of blindness in industrialized countries. Indocyanine green angiography is widely used to study choroidal neovascularization in patients with exudative age-related macular degeneration. In nonexudative AMD, ICGA is used in classification of drusen and associated subretinal deposits.

== Indications ==
Indications for indocyanine green angiography include:

- Choroidal neovascularisation (CNV): Indocyanine green angiography is widely used to study choroidal neovascularization in patients with exudative age-related macular degeneration. In ICGA, CNV is seen as hyperflourescent spot or plaque. It is also useful in diagnosing and classifying CNV associated to serous pigment epithelial detachments in Nonexudative macular degeneration.
- Idiopathic polypoidal choroidal vasculopathy (IPCV)
- Pigmented choroidal melanomas
- Choroidal haemangioma: ICGA can be used to differentiate choroidal haemangioma from other intraocular tumors.
- Choroiditis: In multifocal choroiditis, lesions are visualized as hypoflourescent spots.
- Chorioretinopathy: In Central serous chorioretinopathy, using ICGA multifocal areas of choroidal hyperpermiability can be visualized. In birdshoot chorioretinopathy, lesions appear as symmetrical round or oval hypoflourescent spots. ICGA allows better visualization of lesions in serpiginous chorioretinopathy, punctate inner chorioretinopathy, acute zonal occult outer retinopathy etc. In multiple evanescent white dot syndrome, numerous hypoflourescent spots can be visualized using ICGA.
- Pigmented epithelial detachment
- Retinal angiomatous proliferation (RAP)
- Chorioretinal atrophy: ICGA help evaluating different stages of chorioretinal atrophy.
- Anterior uveitis: ICGA is rarely indicated in anterior uveitis, but it might be used to find out associated choroidal pathology.
- Stargardt disease: Numerous hypoflourescent spots are seen in ICGA.
- Angioid streaks: ICGA can be used for diagnosing angioid streaks and their associated ocular pathologies.
- Vogt–Koyanagi–Harada disease (VKH): ICGA is useful in diagnosing VKH. In VKH, delay in filling of the choriocapillaris along with larger choroidal vessel perfusion and multiple hypofluorescent spots are visible with ICGA.
- Sympathetic ophthalmia: Sympathetic ophthalmia is a bilateral, granulomatous form of uveitis. In sympathetic ophthalmia, numerous dark spots may be visible during the intermediate phase of ICGA.
- Acute idiopathic blind spot enlargement syndrome, to detect hypofluorescent spots around the optic disc and arcades.

== Procedure ==
Fundus camera-based indocyanine green angiography techniques and scanning laser ophthalmoscope-based indocyanine green angiography techniques are there. The concentration of indocyanine green dye may vary according to instrument used. For fundus cameras, 25 ml ICG dissolved in 5 ml solvent is used, it may be increased to 50 ml in patients with poorly dilated pupil and high pigmentation.

To perform test, pupil should be dilated. The dye is injected through the antecubital vein as bolus. Images are taken in several second intervals until the retinal and choroidal circulations are maximally hyperfluorescent. Then for first few minutes, take photos at approximately 30 to 60 second intervals. Pictures taken are classified under three phases:

1. Early phase at 60 seconds: large choroidal arteries and veins are highlighted in this phase.
2. Mid phase at 5–15 minutes: in this phase choroidal vasculature become less distinct and more diffuse, and hyperfluorescent lesions appear bright against the fading background.
3. Late phase at 15–30 minutes: in this phase hyperfluorescent lesions appear bright against the dark background. The choroidal neovascularization are best detected in this phase.

== Advantages over fluorescein angiography ==
Indocyanine green angiography has many advantages over commonly used fundus fluorescein angiography (FFA). Because of its protein-binding properties, its leakage from choriocapillaries is less and thus it will remain longer in choroidal vessels compared to fluorescein dye. Choroidal neovascularization is better visualized by ICGA, than fluorescein angiography. The patient toleration is also better compared to FFA.

== History ==
Physical and physiological properties of indocyanine green dye were first described by Fox and Wood, in 1960. Indocyanine green angiography was developed by Kodak Research Laboratories for determining cardiac output. In 1968, Kogure et al. performed intra-arterial choroidal absorption angiography using indocyanine green dye in monkeys. In the year 1969, using ICGA, Kogure and Choromokos studied cerebral circulation in a dog. In 1971, Hochhimer replaced color film with black and white infrared film. First human ICG angiogram was of carotid artery. First intravenous ICGA in human eye was performed by Flower and Hochheimer in 1972. In 1986 Hayashi et al. used infrared-sensitive video camera to perform ICGA. In the year 1992, Guyer et al. introduced the use of high resolution (1024 × 1024) digital imaging system coupled with infrared video cameras to produce better high resolution images.

== See also ==
- Fundus photography
- Fundus fluorescein angiography
- Eye examination
