= Erythrokeratodermia with ataxia =

- Other names: Giroux–Barbeau syndrome
- Erythrokeratodermia with ataxia is inherited in an autosomal dominant fashion.
- Specialty: Medical genetics

Erythrokeratodermia with ataxia is a condition characterized by erythematous, hyperkeratotic plaques with fine, white, attached scales distributed almost symmetrically on the extremities.

== See also ==
- Hallerman–Streiff syndrome
- List of cutaneous conditions
