= Posterior pole =

Part of the back of the eye

In ophthalmology, the posterior pole is the back of the eye, usually referring to the retina between the optic disc and the macula.

== See also ==
- Fundus (eye)
