= Photopsia =

Presence of perceived flashes of light in one's field of vision

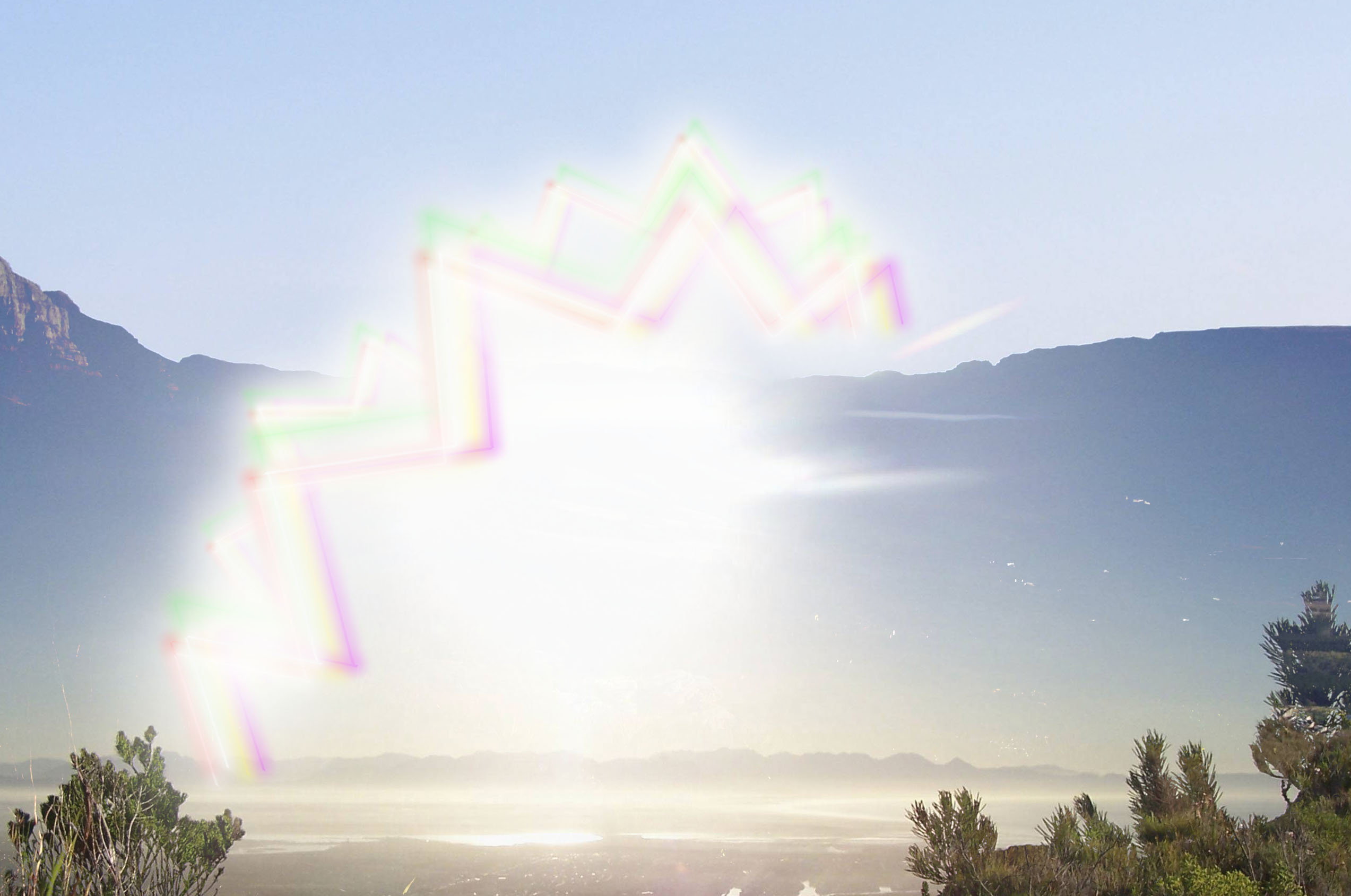
- This is an approximation of the zig-zag visual of a scintillating scotoma as a migraine aura. It moves and vibrates, expanding and slowly fading away over the course of about 20 minutes.
- Specialty: Ophthalmology, Neurology
- Symptoms: Flickering lights or flashes in the field of vision, along with pain, loss of colour perception, and eventual vision loss are also part of the damage to the optic nerve during optic neuritis
- Usual onset: During pregnancy
- Duration: Migraine with aura, which includes photopsia 39% of the time, typically lasts 10 to 20 minutes and often is followed by a headache.
- Causes: Peripheral (Posterior) vitreous detachment, retinal detachment, age-related macular degeneration, ocular (retinal) migraine / migraine aura, vertebrobasilar insufficiency, optic neuritis, occipital lobe infarction (similar to occipital stroke), sensory deprivation (ophthalmopathic hallucinations)
- Risk factors: Above age 50 (risk of retinal detachment)
- Treatment: In most cases, photopsia is a symptom of a preexisting condition. The underlying condition must be identified and treated to resolve the symptoms.

Photopsia is the presence of perceived flashes of light in the field of vision.

It is most commonly associated with:

- posterior vitreous detachment
- migraine aura (ocular migraine / retinal migraine)
- migraine aura without headache
- scintillating scotoma
- retinal break or detachment
- occipital lobe infarction (similar to occipital stroke)
- sensory deprivation (ophthalmopathic hallucinations)
- age-related macular degeneration
- vertebrobasilar insufficiency
- optic neuritis
- visual snow syndrome

Vitreous shrinkage or liquefaction, which is the most common cause of photopsia, causes a pull in vitreoretinal attachments, irritating the retina and causing it to discharge electrical impulses. These impulses are interpreted by the brain as flashes.

This condition has also been identified as a common initial symptom of punctate inner choroiditis (PIC), a rare retinal autoimmune disease believed to be caused by the immune system mistakenly attacking and destroying the retina. During pregnancy, new-onset photopsia is a concern for severe preeclampsia.

Photopsia can present as retinal detachment when examined by an optometrist or ophthalmologist. However, it can also be a sign of uveal melanoma.

== Causes ==
Several conditions affecting the eyes can cause photopsia to occur. The underlying condition must be identified and treated to resolve the symptoms.

=== Peripheral (posterior) vitreous detachment ===
Peripheral (posterior) vitreous detachment occurs when the gel around the eye separates from the retina. This can naturally occur with age. However, if it occurs too rapidly, it can cause photopsia which manifests in flashes and floaters in the vision. Typically, the flashes and floaters go away in a few months.

=== Retinal detachment ===
The retina lines the inside of the eye. It is light-sensitive and communicates visual messages to the brain. If the retina detaches, it moves and shifts from its normal position. This can cause photopsia, but can also cause permanent vision loss. Medical attention is needed to prevent vision loss. Procedures may include laser treatment, freezing, or surgery.

=== Age-related macular degeneration ===
Age-related macular degeneration (AMD) is a common eye condition among people aged 50 and older. The macula is a part of the eye that helps you see sharply straight ahead. With AMD, the macula slowly deteriorates which can cause photopsia.

=== Ocular (retinal) migraine / Migraine aura ===
Migraines are a type of recurring headache. Migraines typically cause severe pain in the head, but can also cause visual changes known as auras. Migraines can also cause visual snow.

=== Optic neuritis ===
Optic neuritis is an inflammation that damages the optic nerve. It's linked to multiple sclerosis (MS). Along with flickering or flashing with eye movement, symptoms include pain, loss of colour perception, and vision loss.

=== Occipital lobe infarction (stroke) or ischemia ===
The occipital lobe is one of four lobes in the brain. It controls the ability to see things. Impaired blood flow to the cells of the occipital lobe (ischemia, for example as caused by a TIA or Vertebrobasilar insufficiency) will lead to temporary visual problems; if the poor blood flow is sustained it will lead to cell death (infarction, for example as caused by a stroke) which may cause persistent visual problems.

The main symptoms associated with an occipital lobe infarction involve changes to vision such as:

- blurry vision
- blindness, which may affect part of vision only
- hallucinations, such as flashing lights (photopsia): usually only in the context of blindness

=== Sensory deprivation (Ophthalmopathic hallucinations) ===
Sensory deprivation or ophthalmopathic hallucination are hallucinations that appear in the field of vision.

== Appearance ==
Photopsias is defined as an effect on the vision that causes appearances of anomalies in the vision. Photopsias usually appear as:

- flickering lights
- shimmering lights
- floating shapes
- moving dots
- snow or static

Photopsias are not generally a condition on their own, but a symptom of another condition.

== See also ==
- Fortification spectra – Visual aura associated with migraine
- Moore's lightning streaks
- Phosphene – Visual illusion
- Infarction – Tissue death due to inadequate blood supply
- Sensory deprivation – Deliberate reduction or removal of stimuli
- Vertebrobasilar insufficiency
