= Bruch's membrane =

Component of the eye

- Detailed illustration showing the bruch's membrane and its layers.

Details
- System: Visual system

Identifiers
- Latin: lamina basalis choroideae
- MeSH: D016570

Bruch's membrane or lamina vitrea is the innermost layer of the choroid of the eye. It is also called the vitreous lamina or Membrane vitriae, because of its glassy microscopic appearance. It is 2–4 μm thick.

== Anatomy ==
=== Structure ===
Bruch's membrane consists of five layers (from inside to outside):

1. the basement membrane of the retinal pigment epithelium
2. the inner collagenous zone
3. a central band of elastic fibers
4. the outer collagenous zone
5. the basement membrane of the choriocapillaris

=== Development ===
The membrane grows thicker with age. With age, lipid-containing extracellular deposits may accumulate between the membrane and the basal lamina of the retinal pigmental epithelium, impairing exchange of solutes and contributing to age-related pathology.

==== Embryology ====
Bruch's membrane is present by midterm in fetal development as an elastic sheet.

== Function ==
The membrane is involved in the regulation of fluid and solute passage from the choroid to the retina.

== Pathology ==
Bruch's membrane thickens with age, slowing the transport of metabolites. This may lead to the formation of drusen in age-related macular degeneration. There is also a buildup of deposits (Basal Linear Deposits or BLinD and Basal Lamellar Deposits BLamD) on and within the membrane, primarily consisting of phospholipids. The accumulation of lipids appears to be greater in the central fundus than in the periphery. This build up seems to fragment the membrane into a lamellar structure more like puff-pastry than a barrier. Inflammatory and neovascular mediators can then invite choroidal vessels to grow into and beyond the fragmented membrane. This neovascular membrane destroys the architecture of the outer retina and leads to sudden loss of central vision – wet age related macular degeneration.

Pseudoxanthoma elasticum, myopia and trauma can also cause defects in Bruch's membrane which may lead to choroidal neovascularization. Alport's Syndrome, a genetic disorder affecting the alpha(IV) collagen chains, can also lead to defects in the Bruch membrane such as 'dot and fleck' retinopathy. Angioid streaks cause calcification, thickening and breaks in Bruch's membrane.

== Eponym ==
Bruch's membrane was named after the German anatomist Karl Wilhelm Ludwig Bruch.
