= E. plicata =

E. plicata may refer to:

- Encyclia plicata, an orchid species
- Eupleura plicata, a sea snail species

== See also ==
- Plicata (disambiguation)
