= Iris cyst =

Hollow cavities in the eye filled with secretion

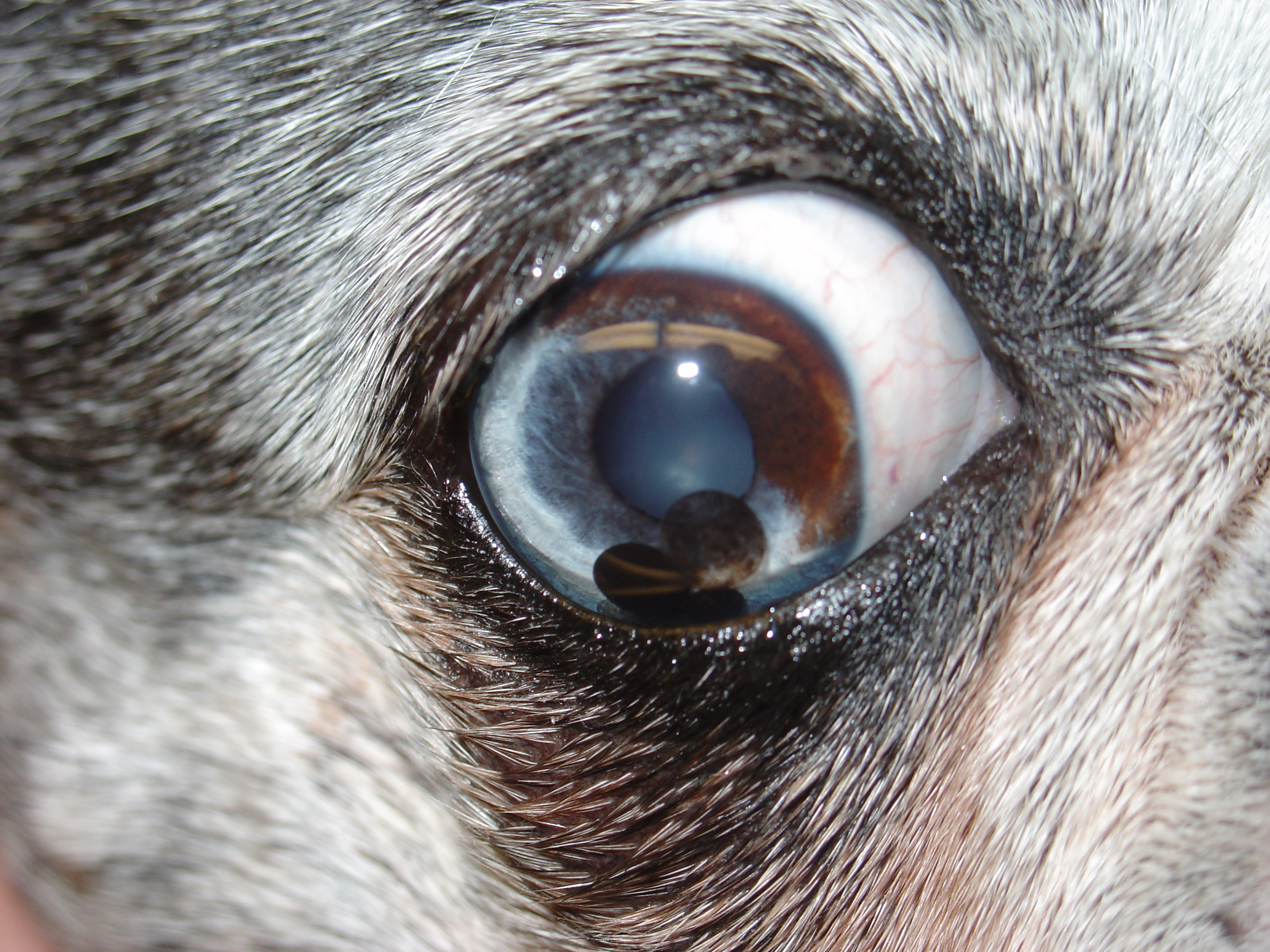
Iris cysts

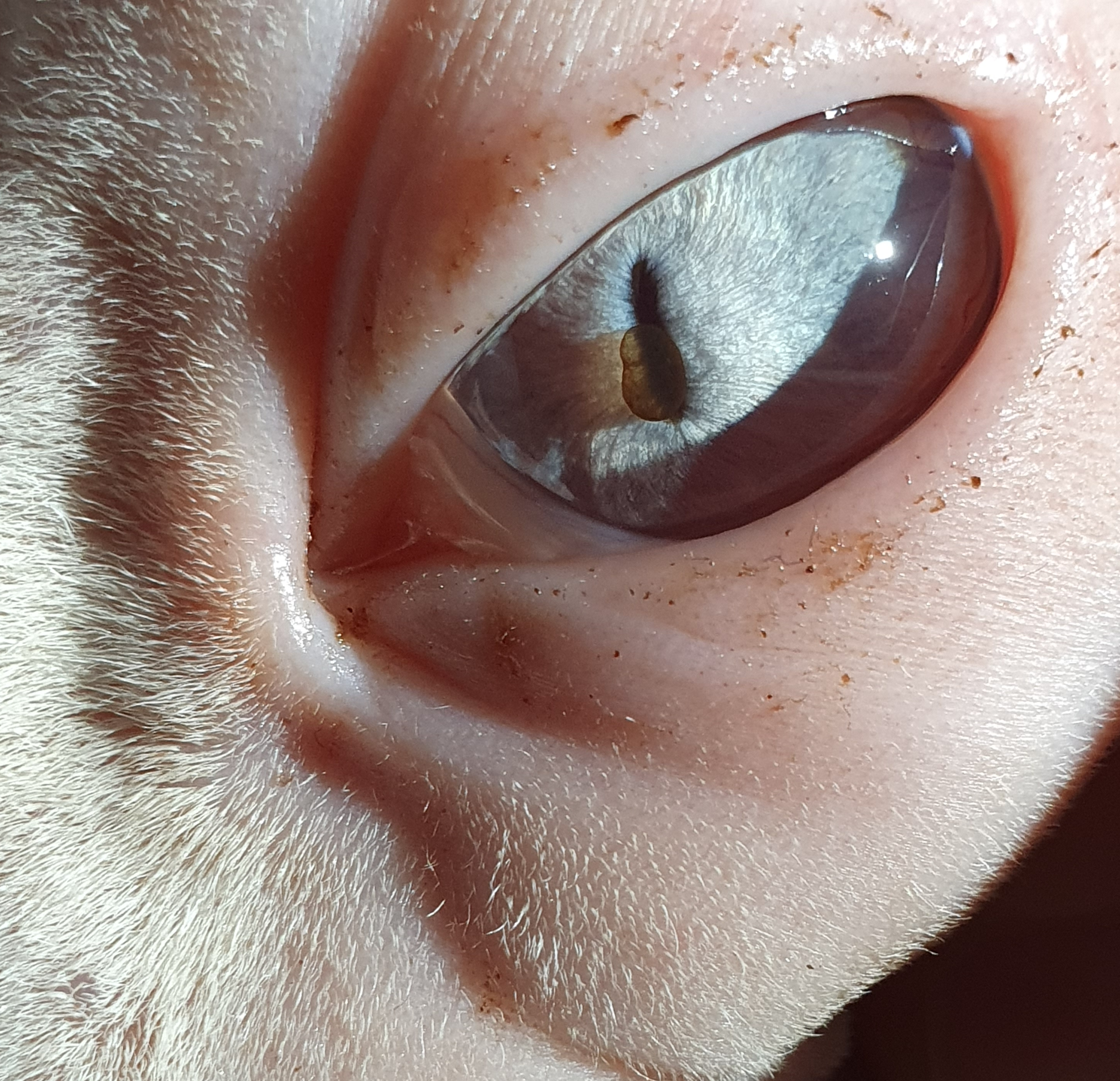
A photo showing an iris cyst in a Sphynx cat. The cyst is characteristically semi-transparent and casts a shadow on the iris.

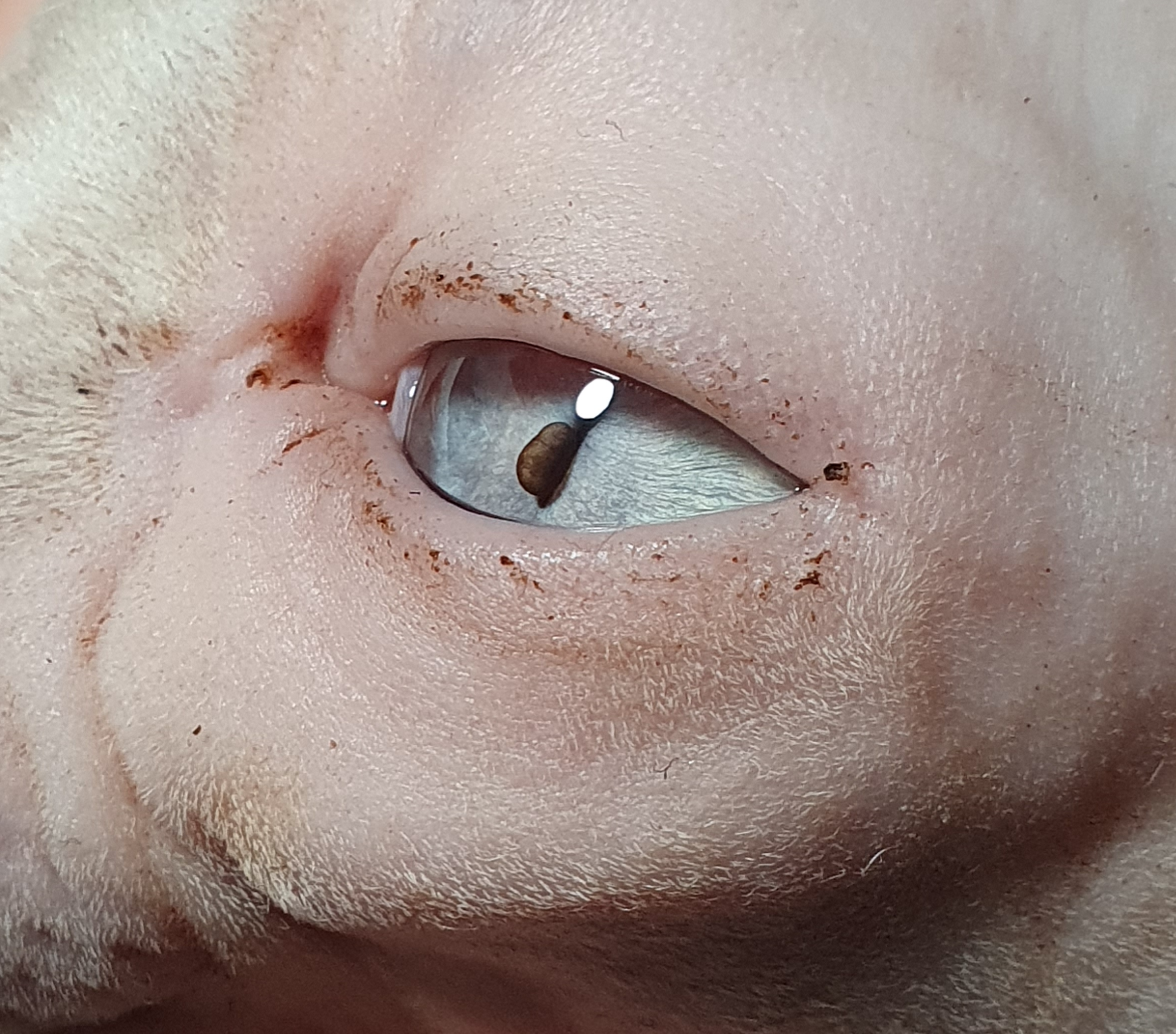
A photo showing an iris cyst in a Sphynx cat. The cyst is characteristically semi-transparent and is attached to the pupil.

Iris cysts are hollow cavities in the eye filled with secretion. They come in various sizes, numbers, shapes, pigments, and can be free-floating, attached to the pupillary margin, or within the posterior chamber. Most frequently iris cysts do not cause any issues, but they can cause problems like: "fly biting" behavior, corneal endothelial pigment, lens capsular pigmentation, altered iris movement, decreased aqueous outflow with subsequent glaucoma, or blocking vision if they grow too big. They can be acquired or innate. Possible causes are inflammation, drug-induced, uveitis, trauma, tumor-induced, parasitic, or implantation. Most frequently iris cysts are benign and need no treatment. Sometimes iris cysts cause problems and need to be deflated. Iris cysts can be treated with trans corneal diode laser treatment, fine-needle aspiration or surgical excision. A conservative approach for the treatment of iris cysts is favored.

== Introduction ==
Mackenzie diagnosed the first iris cyst in 1830, which was a posttraumatic iris cyst in the anterior chamber. Because of the wide variety of iris cysts, a categorization was needed. This categorization was proposed by Shields in 1981 and was based on 2 main groups: primary and secondary cyst. Primary cysts origin is neuroepithelial, and rarely causes any issue. Primary cysts can be subcategorized based on their location in the eye. However, secondary cysts can cause problems like decreased vision, secondary glaucoma, uveitis or corneal edema and origin from implantation, metastasis, miotics or parasites. Secondary cysts are further categorized based on their origin.

== Brief overview of the anatomy of the iris ==
The iris is a thin circular structure in the eye which consists of two layers, on top is the stroma and underneath the pigmented epithelial cells. It separates the eye in the anterior and posterior chamber, is responsible for the eye's color, and its function is to regulate the size of the pupil. By controlling the size of the pupil it regulates the amount of light reaching the retina. Depending on the amount of light, the iris opens with high intensity light and closes with low intensity light. The iris is able to control the size of the pupil due to radial and circular muscles which attach to the stroma. The circular muscle, sphincter muscle, contracts in a circular motion, making the pupil smaller, but by contracting the radial muscles, dilator muscles, the pupil enlarges.

== Primary cyst ==
The classification of primary cysts is according to the categorization of Shields. The origin of primary cysts is neuroepithelial. Primary cysts are rarely causing any problems, fluid-filled and have smooth surfaces. They are subcategorized according to their location in the eye. Pupillary cysts, also central cysts, are located from the pupillary margin to the iris root, midzonal cysts are located from the iris root to the ciliary body, and peripheral cysts are located at the iridociliary sulcus. Free-floating cysts can occur in the anterior and vitreous chamber and are usually dislodged epithelium cysts.

Cysts of the iris stroma are anteriorly located and as they develop, they usually cause deformation of the iris and need treatment. Especially the congenital secondary cysts require often treatment. They are usually unilateral and solitary. Acquired secondary cysts, on the other hand, require very rarely treatment and often occur at a later age.

== Secondary cyst ==
Secondary cysts are usually unilateral and solitary and have a smooth surface. Secondary cysts may obstruct the eye's vision, cause intraocular pressure or iris displacement. The categorization of secondary cysts is categorized according Shields categorization. Secondary cysts are classified into 6 subcategories.

- Implantation cysts are the most common secondary cysts. They can originate from a surgical trauma or a penetrating wound. An invasion of conjunctival or corneal epithelial cells creates the cyst.
- Drug-induced cysts are related with the use of miotics or latanoprost but can get smaller after stopping inducing the drug.
- Uveitic cysts can arise when the eye is or has been inflamed.
- Tumor-induced secondary cysts are caused by a tumor.
- The rarest iris cyst is the parasitic cyst, which can develop with the presence of a parasite.
- At last secondary cysts can be caused by a systematic disorder like: diabetes mellitus, Menkes syndrome or malignancies.

== Diagnosis ==
Iris cyst must be differentiated from other kinds of possible "bodies" in the eye. After the body has been established as an iris cyst, it must be categorized as primary or secondary. It is necessary to differentiate secondary cysts even further. Clinical examination can achieve this differentiation with the use of multimodal imaging techniques like UBM, ultrasound B-scan (USB), anterior segment optical coherence tomography (as-OCT) and magnetic resonance imaging.

=== Clinical presentation ===
Primary cysts come in various sizes and number but are usually fluid-filled, with regular borders and a smooth surface. The iris could be slightly displaced anteriorly because of a primary cyst, but normally no problems occur with primary cysts. Secondary cysts cause most of the times problems, and thus also need treatment. Secondary cysts usually have a rough surface, irregular borders, solitary and unilateral. Possible problems could be displacement of the iris, iritis and raised intraocular pressure.

A clinician should also be able to tell the difference between a cyst and a tumor. The main differences are that cysts usually cause displacement or the iris whereas a tumor arises and grows into the iris stroma. In the presence of an intrinsic or sentinel vessel than you probably have to deal with a tumor. The last main difference can be shown with transillumination, since transillumination always creates a shadow with a tumor but almost never with a cyst.

=== Ultrasound B-scan (USB) ===
Ultrasound B-scan (USB) uses wavelengths of 10-20 MHz to form an image of the eye. USB can be used to identify the extension of the iris cyst in either the anterior or posterior chamber. It can also be used to identify midzonal cysts behind the iris and to determine whether there is ciliary body involvement. The preferred method to determine ciliary body involvement, however, is not USB but ultrasound biomicroscopy.

=== Ultrasound biomicroscopy (UBM) ===
Ultrasound biomicroscopy, (UBM) has a higher resolution than USB and it also uses soundwaves with a higher frequency from 50 to 100 MHz. UBM is used for the identification of thin ultrastructure's and for internal echogenicity of cysts. Due to the high resolution small cysts can easily be distinguished, multilocated cysts are easy to find and it is easier to determine whether the cyst is bilateral. The only disadvantage of UBM is its limited penetration. Despite this disadvantage, UBM is still the golden standard for the diagnosis of iris cysts.

=== Anterior segment optical coherence tomography (AS-OCT) ===
AS-OCT has the highest resolution of all diagnosis methods but it has a major disadvantage. AS-OCT creates a heavy shadowing caused by the iris pigment epithelium regarding iris lesions. AS-OCT is used to show the anterior border of an iris lesion. The internal structure of the cyst and what is behind the cyst, however, is not that clear due to heavy shadowing. That is why UBM is preferred over AS-OCT, the borders will be less visible but with UBM the whole structure of the cyst and the surrounding tissues is shown.

=== Fine-needle aspiration (FNA) ===
Fine-needle aspiration, FNA, is only used if every other method has failed to establish what kind of cyst it is and if it is presumably a solid tumor. FNA is used as a last diagnosis method because it is the most invasive method since the eye has to be penetrated with a needle. FNA has been very successful with differentiating tumors with cystic spaces, like melanomas, adenomas or metastatic tumors. FNA can also be used as a treatment.

=== Other ancillary procedures ===
MRI is not used as a diagnosis method by itself. It is more used as a method to gain some extra information about the cyst. Magnetic resonance imaging can establish very well whether the cyst is in contact or attached to the sclera or whether the cyst is a primary tumor.

== Treatment options ==
=== Observation ===
The preferred treatment option is observation, since most iris cysts do not hurt or cause any pressure. A veterinarian however prefers to check the cyst from time to time to make sure that the cyst does not grow and does not cause any problems or pain. If the cyst is growing, causing pain or some issues over time, then the cyst will need another treatment.

=== Fine-needle aspiration ===
Fine-needle aspiration (FNA) is, as discussed earlier, also a diagnosis method but can also be used as a treatment. With FNA a very fine needle is inserted in the eye in the cyst. The purpose of the needle is to penetrate the membrane of the cyst, so that the cyst will deflate. This method has proven to be successful but there is a possibility that the cyst will not disappear fully but only shrink. If the cyst has shrunk enough that it is not causing any pain or trouble anymore, then a second treatment might not be necessary. But if the cyst is still causing an issue after the treatment, the treatment must be repeated, or another method has to be used.

=== Intracystic injection of absolute alcohol ===
Intracystic injection of absolute alcohol has proven to be a very effective method. The alcohol gets injected in the cyst through a needle which is penetrating the eye from outside into the cyst. The injection of the alcohol regresses the cyst or will at least stabilize it. It can take a few weeks before the cyst has disappeared fully. A common side effect of this method is an inflammation in the anterior chamber, but this can easily be treated with topical steroids (cream or gel with anti-inflammatory properties).

=== Antimitotic agents ===
Antimitotic agents are used mainly when a cyst is resistant to all other treatments apart from surgery, since surgery is the last resort. Antimitotic agents are injected into the cyst and left inside for 5 minutes; after 5 minutes the agents are rinsed out. Antimitotic agents have the side effect of creating a small inflammation which can easily be treated with topical steroids. Antimitotic agents stop the mitose of the cells of the cyst by interfering with a particular phase of the cell cycle, which stops the cyst from growing and will eventually kill the cells and thus the cyst.

=== Laser therapy ===
Laser therapy is a treatment which has to be repeated several times. The treatment gets repeated every week until the cyst is gone. Despite not having the highest success rate it is nowadays the most preferred treatment against iris cyst because it is the least invasive method since the eye doesn't need to be punctured or cut. Two kinds of laser beams can be used for laser therapy: thermal (diode or argon laser) and Nd:YAG laser. Sometimes both methods are combined for a better result since thermal laser can harden the cyst and stop the intracystic fluid production and Nd:YAG can perforate the cyst membrane and drain the cyst.

=== Surgical ===
Surgery is considered to be the last resort because surgery has the highest chance at complications. The surgical approach depends on where the cyst is located, how big the cyst is and the number of cysts.

=== The stepwise minimally invasive strategy ===
There are many options when treating an iris cyst. Mentioned above are the most used treatments but in the past there have been other methods but they haven't been successful enough to be still used today. A clinician has to consider a lot of things when choosing a treatment. The golden rule when treating iris cysts however is to choose the least invasive method. That means that cysts which are not causing any problems will not be treated but observed. The least invasive treatment is laser therapy and is, therefore, also the preferred method to treat an iris cyst. Depending on the kind of cyst, the clinician will choose either antimitotic agents or AS-OCT, if laser has failed or if laser is not possible. It is unlike that FNA will be used due to its low potential for removing the cyst. Surgery is the most invasive method and the one with the highest chance of complications. That is why surgery is the last resort.
