= Staphyloma =

Abnormal protusion from the eyeball

A staphyloma is an abnormal protrusion of the uveal tissue through a weak point in the eyeball. The protrusion is generally black in colour, due to the inner layers of the eye. It occurs due to weakening of outer layer of eye (cornea or sclera) by an inflammatory or degenerative condition. It may be of five types, depending on the location on the eyeball (bulbus oculi).

== Anterior (corneal) staphyloma ==
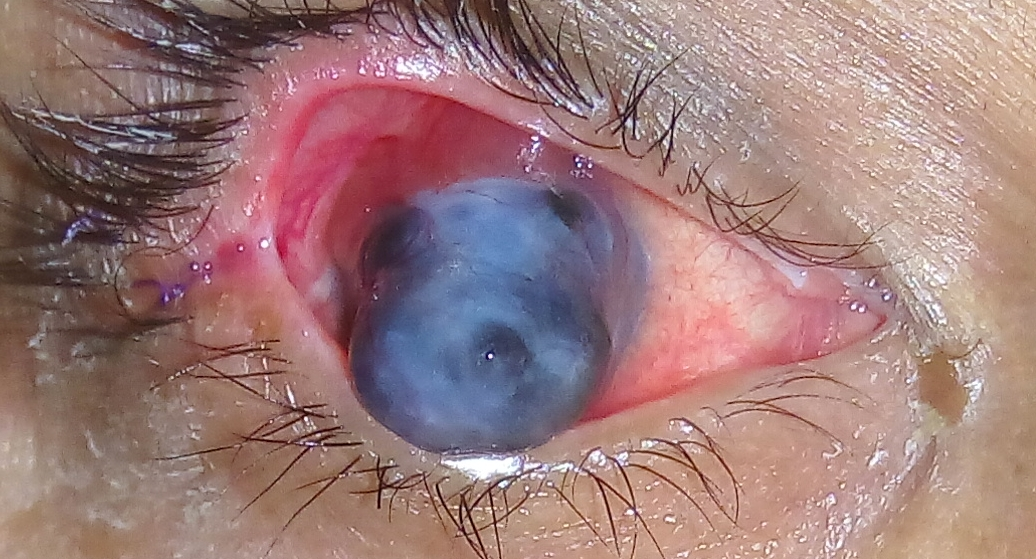
Anterior staphyloma after fungal corneal ulcer.

In the anterior segment of the eye, involving the cornea and the nearby sclera. It is an ectasia and outpouching of the pseudocornea ( the scar formed from organised exudates and fibrous tissue covered with epithelium over the iris) which results after total sloughing of cornea in sloughening corneal ulcer with iris plastered behind; the pseudocornea, being too weak to resist the IOP protrudes forward with the uveal tissue. This is known as anterior staphyloma.

== Intercalary staphyloma ==
It is the name given to the localised bulge in limbal area, lined by the root of the iris. It results due to ectasia of weak scar tissue formed at the limbus, following healing of a perforating injury or a peripheral corneal ulcer. There may be associated secondary angle closure glaucoma, may cause progression of the bulge if not treated. Defective vision occurs due to marked corneal astigmatism. Treatment consists of localised staphylectomy under heavy doses of oral steroids.

== Ciliary staphyloma ==
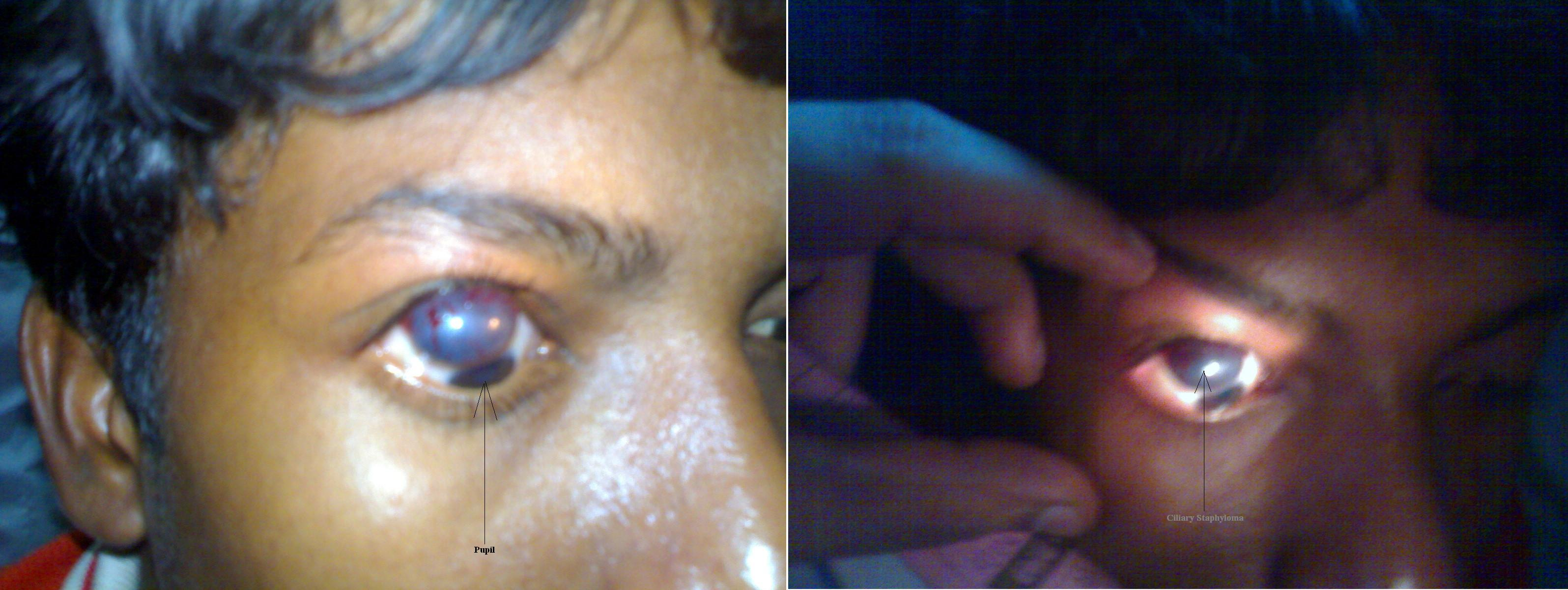
Ciliary Staphyloma

As the name implies, it is the bulge of weak sclera lined by ciliary body, which occurs about 2–3 mm away from the limbus. Its common causes are thinning of sclera following perforating injury, scleritis & absolute glaucoma. It is a part of anterior staphyloma.

== Equatorial staphyloma ==
On the equator of the eye (region circumferencing the largest diameter orthogonal to the visual axis). Its causes are scleritis & degeneration of sclera in pathological myopia. It occurs more commonly in the regions of sclera which are perforated by vortex veins.

== Posterior staphyloma ==
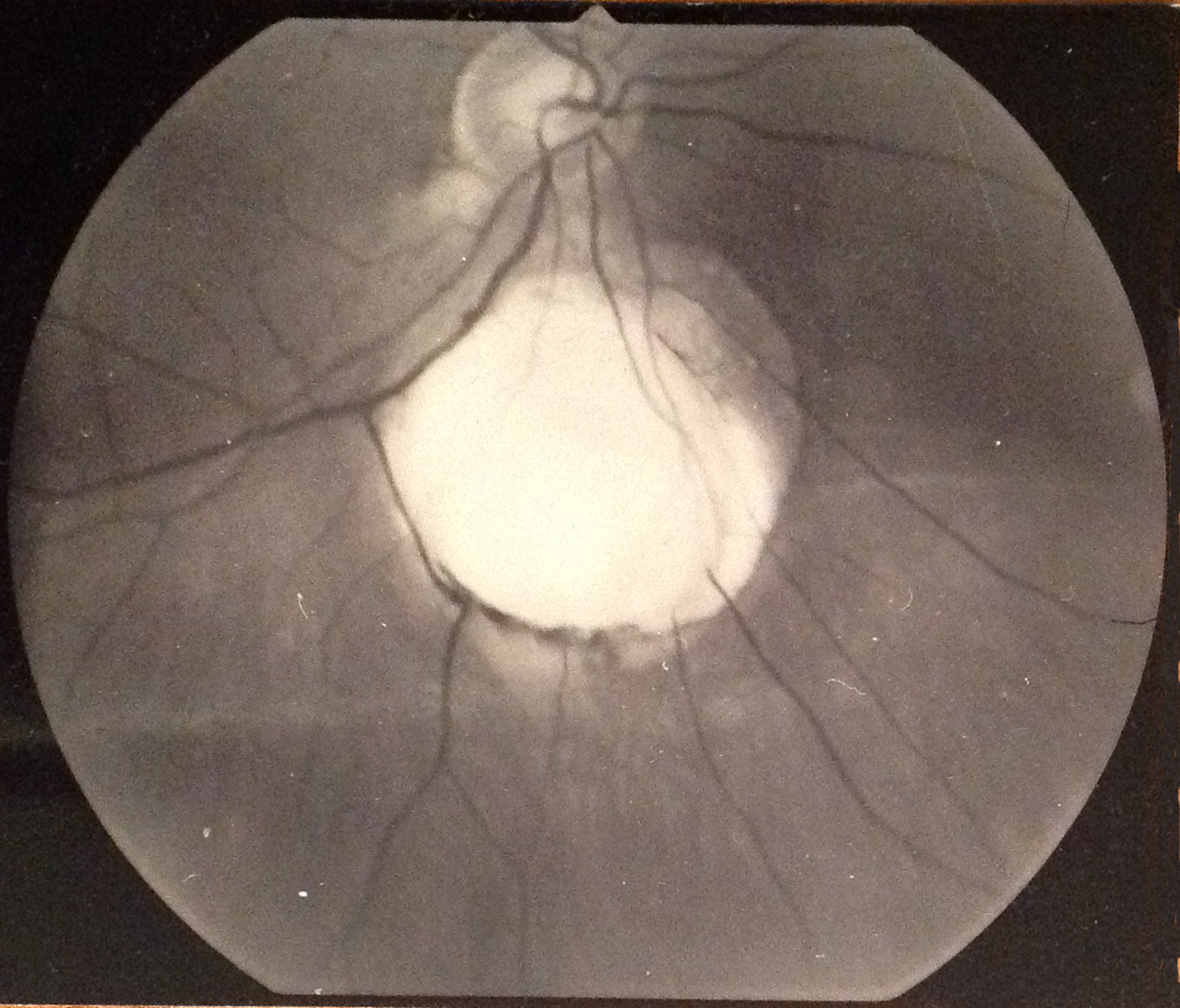
Posterior staphyloma inferior to the optic nerve (right eye)

In the posterior segment of the eye, typically diagnosed at the region of the optic nerve or macula, deforming the eye in a way that the eye-length is extended associated with myopia (nearsightedness). It is diagnosed by ophthalmoscopy, which shows an area of retinal excavation in the region of the staphyloma.

== Epidemiology ==
In a Japanese community-based cohort, 2.05% of right eyes were found to have posterior staphyloma.
