= A. plicata =

A. plicata may refer to:

- Acacia plicata, a wattle species endemic to Western Australia
- Amblema plicata, the threeridge, a freshwater mussel species

== See also ==
- Plicata (disambiguation)
