= Mammalian vision =

Mammalian vision is the process of mammals perceiving light, analyzing it and forming subjective sensations, on the basis of which the animal's idea of the spatial structure of the external world is formed. Responsible for this process in mammals is the visual sensory system, the foundations of which were formed at an early stage in the evolution of chordates. Its peripheral part is formed by the eyes, the intermediate (by the transmission of nerve impulses) - the optic nerves, and the central - the visual centers in the cerebral cortex.

The recognition of visual stimuli in mammals is the result of the joint work of the eyes and the brain. At the same time, a significant part of the visual information is processed already at the receptor level, which allows to significantly reduce the amount of such information received by the brain. Elimination of redundancy in the amount of information is inevitable: if the amount of information delivered to the receptors of the visual system is measured in millions of bits per second (in humans - about 1×10^{7} bits/s), the capabilities of the nervous system to process it are limited to tens of bits per second.

The organs of vision in mammals are, as a rule, well developed, although in their life they are of less importance than for birds: usually mammals pay little attention to immovable objects, so even cautious animals such as a fox or a hare may come close to a human who stands still without movement. The size of the eyes in mammals is relatively small; in humans, eye weight is 1% of the mass of the head, while in a starling it reaches 15%. Nocturnal animals (for example, tarsiers) and animals that live in open landscapes have larger eyes. The vision of forest animals is not so sharp, and in burrowing underground species (moles, gophers, zokors), eyes are reduced to a greater extent, in some cases (marsupial moles, mole rats, blind mole), they are even covered by a skin membrane.

== Mammalian eye ==
Like other vertebrates, the mammalian eye develops from the anterior brain vesicle and has a rounded shape (eyeball).

Mammal eye structure:

1 — sclera,
2 — uvea,
3 — schlemm's canal,
4 — iris root (Radix iridis),
5 — cornea,
6 — iris,
7 — pupil,
8 — anterior chamber of eyeball,
9 — posterior chamber of eyeball,
10 — ciliary body,
11 — lens,
12 — vitreous body,
13 — retina,
14 — optic nerve,
15 — zonule of Zinn.

== Literature ==
- Campbell, N. A.; Reece, J. B.; Urry, L. A. (2011). Biology. 9th ed. Benjamin Cummings. ISBN 9780321558237.
- Vaughan T. A., Ryan J. M., Czaplewski N. J. (2011). Mammalogy. 5th ed. Sudbury, Massachusetts: Jones & Bartlett Learning. ISBN 978-0-7637-6299-5.
