= Toxic anterior segment syndrome =

- Specialty: Ophthalmology

Toxic anterior segment syndrome is an acute, sterile anterior segment inflammation following generally uneventful cataract and anterior segment surgery.

One of the main factors in differentiating toxic anterior segment syndrome from an infectious endophthalmitis is the rapid onset. Most patients with toxic anterior segment syndrome will develop symptoms within 12 to 24 hours of the surgery. Common findings on anterior segment slit lamp examination include increased cell and flare with associated fibrin and possible hypopyon formation. Patients may show signs of diffuse corneal edema, and they may also show signs of iris atrophy with pupillary abnormalities and eventual increased intraocular pressure.

It is important to differentiate sterile postoperative inflammation from infectious endophthalmitis because the treatments of these patients are markedly different. Patients with toxic anterior segment syndrome will often respond rapidly to treatment with topical corticosteroids, while infectious endophthalmitis must be treated with antibiotics. It is important that the patients be evaluated often to ensure that the inflammation is clearing and that the patient's intraocular pressure is under control. The clearing of the inflammation and eventual patient outcome is related to the severity of the toxic insult at the time of surgery. Most patients reported to date are in the category of a moderate toxic inflammation.

Toxic anterior segment syndrome may be related to problems with any irrigating solution or other solution placed in the patient's eye during surgery, including balanced salt solution or anything added to solutions. Material placed in the eye during surgery such as anesthetics, ophthalmic viscoelastic devices, antibiotics, or other medications has been associated with toxic anterior segment syndrome. Problems related to the cleaning and sterilization of instruments for cataract surgery have been found to be a cause.
