= Eupleura vokesorum =

Scientific classification
- Kingdom: Animalia
- Phylum: Mollusca
- Class: Gastropoda
- Subclass: Caenogastropoda
- Order: Neogastropoda
- Family: Muricidae
- Genus: Eupleura
- Species: E. vokesorum

Binomial name
- Eupleura vokesorum Herbert, 2005

Species of gastropod

Eupleura vokesorum is a species of sea snail, a marine gastropod mollusk in the family Muricidae, the murex snails or rock snails.
