= Vitreous chamber =

Space in the eye occupied by vitreous humor

- Schematic diagram of the human eye

Details

Identifiers
- Latin: camera postrema; camera vitrea
- TA98: A15.2.06.006
- TA2: 6807
- FMA: 58848

The vitreous chamber is the largest of the three chambers in the eye and is located behind the lens and in front of the optic nerve. The vitreous chamber is located in the posterior cavity of the eye. This chamber is occupied with a thick, clear gel-like substance called the vitreous humor.

== Structure ==
Within the vertebrate eye, there are considered to be three chambers: anterior, posterior, and vitreous. The eye can also be classified as having two cavities: anterior and posterior. Both the anterior and posterior chambers are located within the anterior cavity, while the vitreous chamber is located in the posterior cavity. The best way to distinguish between the two cavities is to use the lens as a dividing point. The vitreous chamber is the largest of the three chambers and is located behind the lens and in front of the optic nerve. Recent research (2024) has demonstrated that the volume of the vitreous chamber varies significantly between individuals and is correlated with axial length and refractive status. Eyes with high axial myopia tend to have larger vitreous chamber volumes, whereas eyes with shorter axial length associated with hyperopia generally have smaller volumes. These interindividual differences have raised interest in investigating whether individualized or personalized approaches to intravitreal therapies and vitreoretinal surgeries may provide advantages over a uniform "one-size-fits-all" paradigm, particularly with respect to intraocular drug concentration, dilution effects, and dosing considerations of drugs and gas/siloil implantations. Such questions are currently being evaluated in ongoing clinical and large multicenter studies.

The vitreous chamber is filled with a thick, clear gel-like substance called the vitreous humor (also vitreous body). The humor plays a crucial role in supporting the posterior side of the lens.

== Function ==
The vitreous fluid, along with supporting the lens, also functions in maintaining the shape of the entire vitreous chamber and posterior cavity. It is imperative that the eye remains the proper shape to ensure that the light passing through the lens and the fluid can focus properly on the retina. The composition of the fluid is 99% water and contains no cells, so the light can effectively pass through without it being deflected. The fluid is often thought to be a sort of liquid lens that further focuses the light that has already passed through the lens on the way to towards the retina.

== See also ==
- Vitreous detachment
- Aqueous humor
