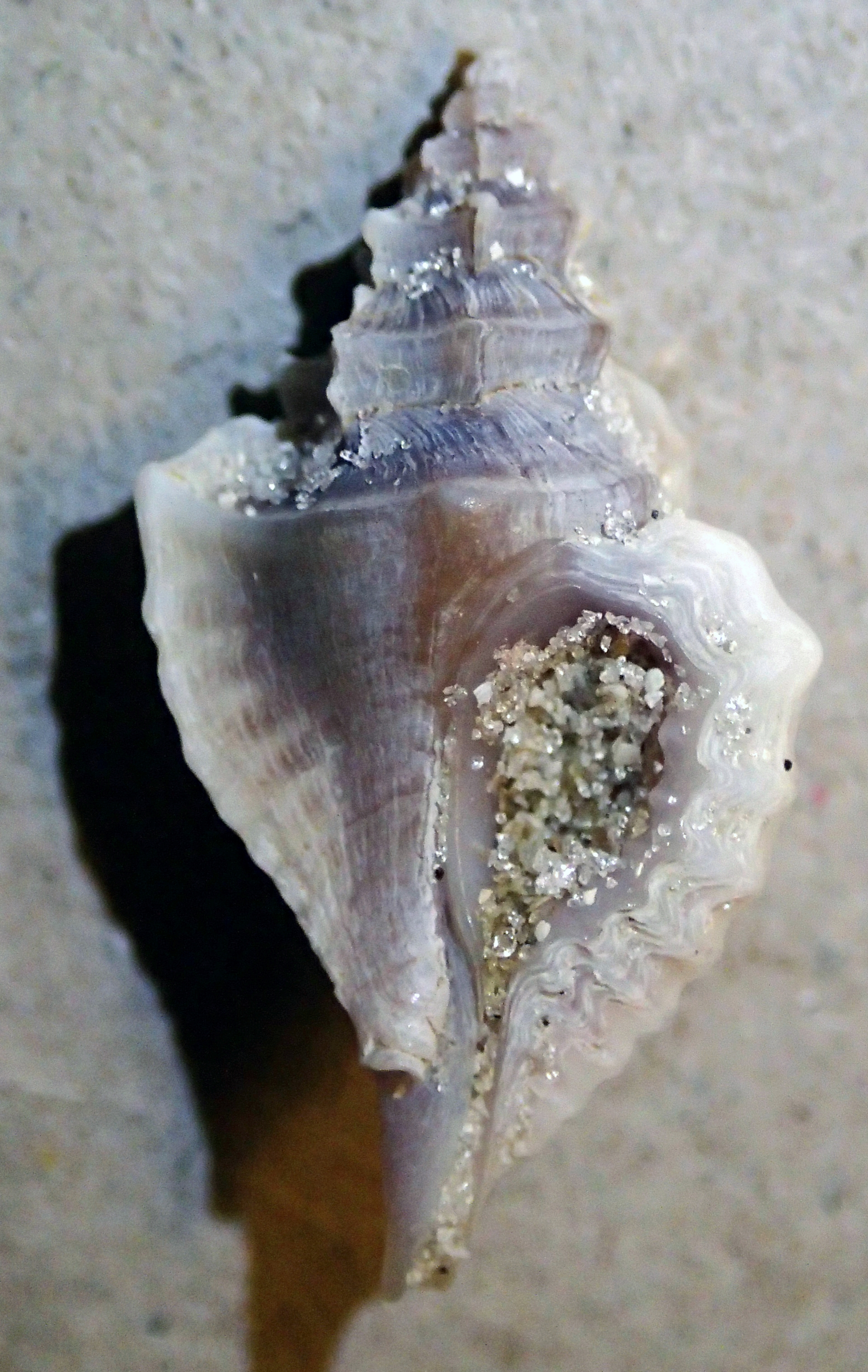

Scientific classification
- Kingdom: Animalia
- Phylum: Mollusca
- Class: Gastropoda
- Subclass: Caenogastropoda
- Order: Neogastropoda
- Family: Muricidae
- Genus: Eupleura
- Species: E. sulcidentata

Binomial name
- Eupleura sulcidentata Dall, 1890

Synonyms
- Eupleura caudata var. sulcidentata Dall, 1890

= Eupleura sulcidentata =

Species of gastropod

Eupleura sulcidentata, common name the sharp-ribbed drill, is a species of sea snail, a marine gastropod mollusk in the family Muricidae, the murex snails or rock snails.

== Description ==
This is a small species, reaching only up to 25mm.

Overall shape is that of a fairly typical murex in miniature, though its varices ("ribs") are spaced at approximately 180° apart, rather than the ~120° more common in murexes. The varices have a wavy appearance and a sharp-looking edge. In-between the varices are smaller bumps or nodes. Color is usually whitish or off-white, occasionally buff or even brown. Sometimes a brown stripe is present on the upper part of each whorl.

The sharp-ribbed drill is a carnivore and, as the name "drill" implies, it bores holes into the shells of other mollusks using its radular teeth.

== Distribution ==
This species is known to occur in the Gulf of Mexico and Caribbean Sea.
