= Eupleura =

- Eupleura

Scientific classification
- Kingdom: Animalia
- Phylum: Mollusca
- Class: Gastropoda
- Subclass: Caenogastropoda
- Order: Neogastropoda
- Family: Muricidae
- Subfamily: Ocenebrinae
- Genus: Eupleura; Adams, 1853

Genus of gastropods

Eupleura is a genus of sea snails, marine gastropod mollusks in the family Muricidae, the murex snails or rock snails.

== Species ==
Species within the genus Eupleura include:

- Eupleura caudata (Say, 1822)
- Eupleura limata (Dall, 1890)
- Eupleura muriciformis (Broderip, 1833)
- Eupleura nitida (Broderip, 1833)
- Eupleura pectinata (Hinds, 1844)
- Eupleura plicata (Reeve, 1844)
- Eupleura sulcidentata (Dall, 1890)
- Eupleura tampaensis (Conrad, 1846)
- Eupleura triquetra (Reeve, 1844)
- Eupleura vokesorum (Herbert, 2005)
