= Eupleura nitida =

Scientific classification
- Kingdom: Animalia
- Phylum: Mollusca
- Class: Gastropoda
- Subclass: Caenogastropoda
- Order: Neogastropoda
- Family: Muricidae
- Genus: Eupleura
- Species: E. nitida

Binomial name
- Eupleura nitida (Broderip, 1833)

Synonyms
- Ranella nitida Broderip, 1833

Species of gastropod

Eupleura nitida is a species of sea snail, a marine gastropod mollusk in the family Muricidae, the murex or rock snails.
