= Eupleura muriciformis =

Scientific classification
- Kingdom: Animalia
- Phylum: Mollusca
- Class: Gastropoda
- Subclass: Caenogastropoda
- Order: Neogastropoda
- Family: Muricidae
- Genus: Eupleura
- Species: E. muriciformis

Binomial name
- Eupleura muriciformis (Broderip, 1833)

Synonyms
- Eupleura unispinosa Dall, 1890; Ranella muriciformis Broderip, 1833

Species of gastropod

Eupleura muriciformis is a species of sea snail, a marine gastropod mollusk in the family Muricidae, the murex snails or rock snails.
