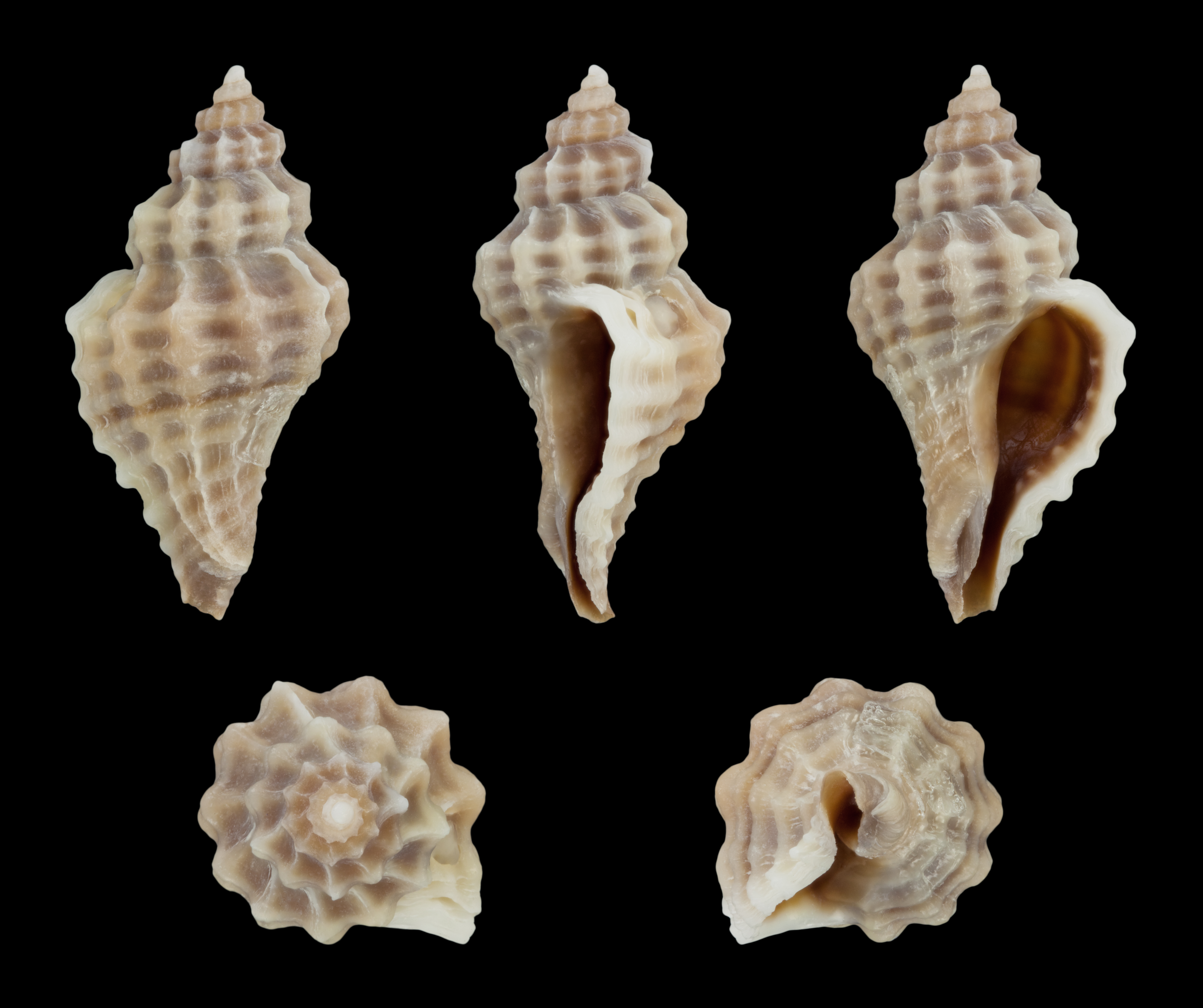

Scientific classification
- Kingdom: Animalia
- Phylum: Mollusca
- Class: Gastropoda
- Subclass: Caenogastropoda
- Order: Neogastropoda
- Family: Muricidae
- Genus: Eupleura
- Species: E. tampaensis

Binomial name
- Eupleura tampaensis (Conrad, 1846)

Synonyms
- Murex tampaensis Conrad, 1846; Urosalpinx tampaensis (Conrad, 1846)

= Eupleura tampaensis =

Species of gastropod

Eupleura tampaensis is a species of sea snail, a marine gastropod mollusk in the family Muricidae, the murex snails or rock snails.

== Description ==
The length of the shell attains 25 mm.

== Distribution ==
This marine species occurs off Florida.
