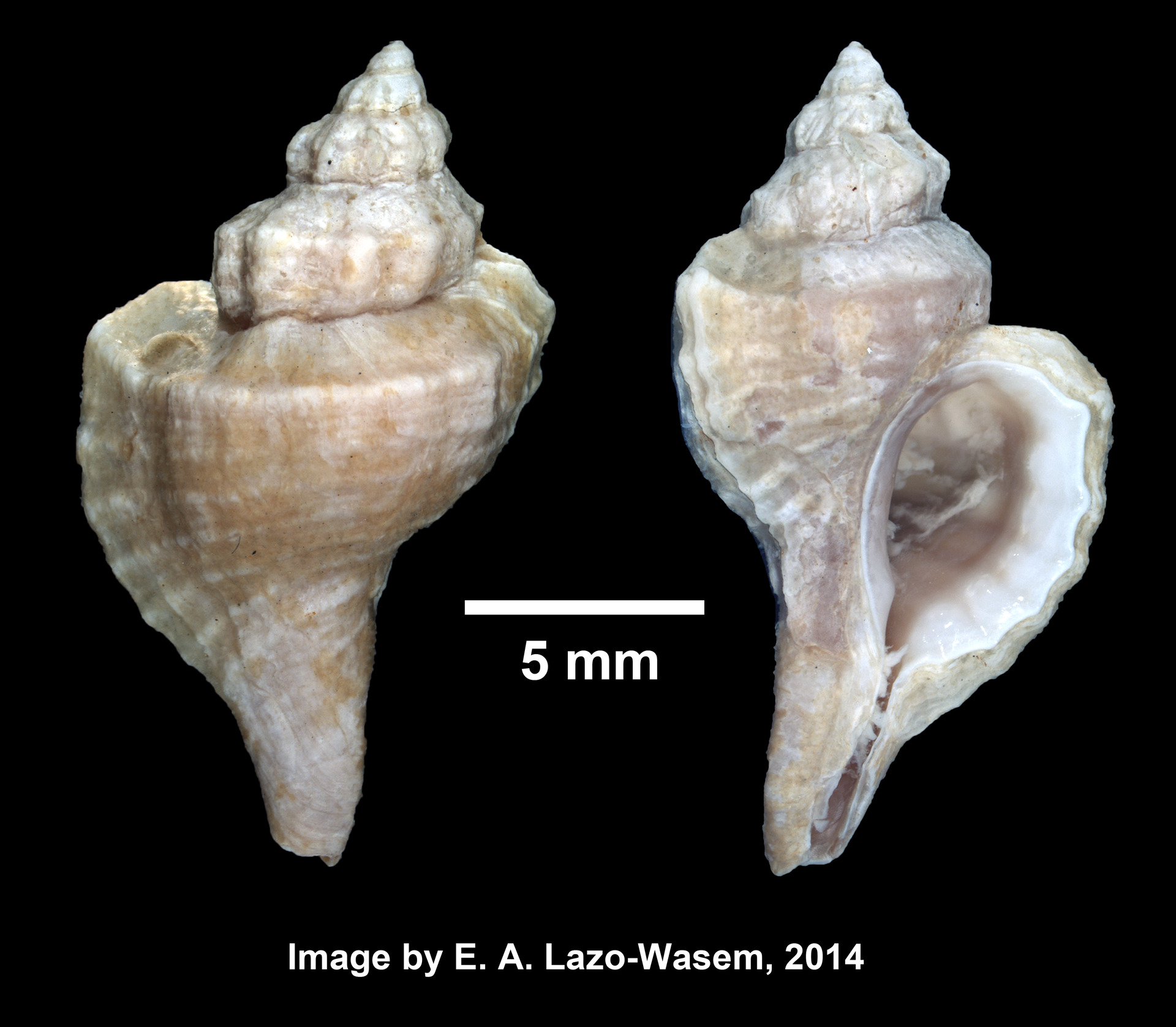

Scientific classification
- Kingdom: Animalia
- Phylum: Mollusca
- Class: Gastropoda
- Subclass: Caenogastropoda
- Order: Neogastropoda
- Family: Muricidae
- Genus: Eupleura
- Species: E. caudata

Binomial name
- Eupleura caudata (Say, 1822)

Synonyms
- Eupleura caudata var. etterae Baker, 1951; Ranella caudata Say, 1822

= Eupleura caudata =

Species of gastropod

Eupleura caudata is a species of sea snail, a marine gastropod mollusk in the family Muricidae, the murex snails or rock snails. This species occurs on the Atlantic Coast of North America.
