= Eupleura limata =

Scientific classification
- Kingdom: Animalia
- Phylum: Mollusca
- Class: Gastropoda
- Subclass: Caenogastropoda
- Order: Neogastropoda
- Family: Muricidae
- Genus: Eupleura
- Species: E. limata

Binomial name
- Eupleura limata Dall, 1890

Synonyms
- Eupleura muriciformis var. limata Dall, 1890

Species of gastropod

Eupleura limata is a species of sea snail, a marine gastropod mollusk in the family Muricidae, the murex snails or rock snails.
