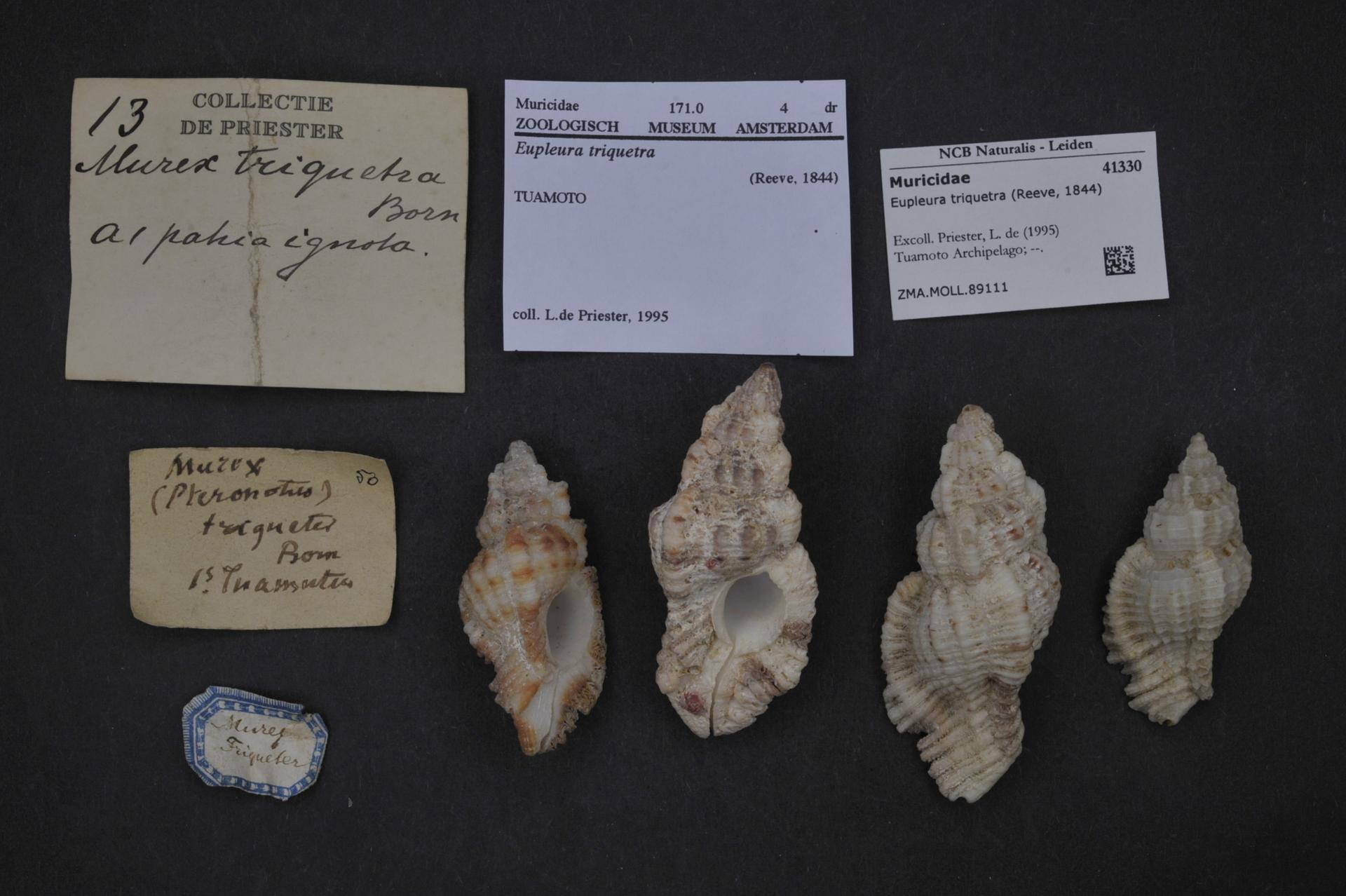
- Eupleura triquetra

Scientific classification
- Kingdom: Animalia
- Phylum: Mollusca
- Class: Gastropoda
- Subclass: Caenogastropoda
- Order: Neogastropoda
- Family: Muricidae
- Genus: Eupleura
- Species: E. triquetra

Binomial name
- Eupleura triquetra (Reeve, 1844)

Synonyms
- Ranella triquetra Reeve, 1844

= Eupleura triquetra =

Species of gastropod

Eupleura triquetra is a species of sea snail, a marine gastropod mollusk in the family Muricidae, the murex snails or rock snails.
