= Plicata =

Plicata, plicate, plicated, pleated or folded in Latin, may refer to:

- Lingua plicata, a benign condition characterized by deep grooves in the dorsum of the tongue
- Pars plicata, the folded and most anterior portion of the ciliary body, which in turn is part of the uvea, choroidea, one of the three layers that comprise the eye

== See also ==
- Glossary of botanical terms § plicate
