= Pars plicata =

Portion of the eye

The pars plicata (also known as corona ciliaris) (Latin: folded portion) is the folded and most anterior portion of the ciliary body of an eye. The ciliary body is a part of the uvea, one of the three layers that comprise the eye. The pars plicata is located anterior to the pars plana portion of the ciliary body, and posterior to the iris. The lens zonules that are used to control accommodation are attached to the pars plana.

The pars plicata is the portion of the ciliary body that is responsible for producing aqueous humor, the fluid of the anterior chamber. The production of too much aqueous humor, or reabsorption that occurs too slowly, can lead to increases in the pressure within the eye.
