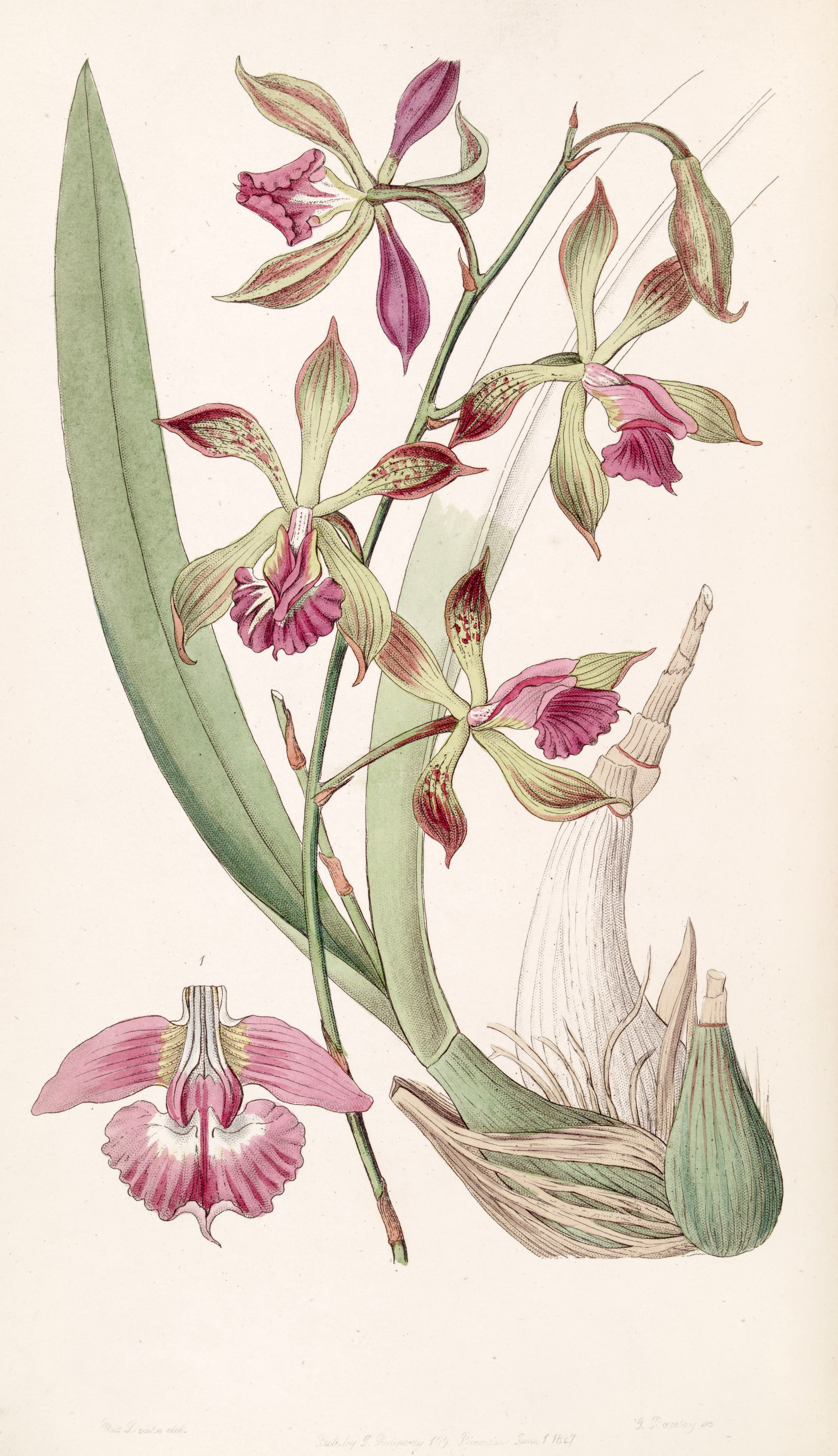

Conservation status
- Endangered (IUCN 3.1)

Scientific classification
- Kingdom: Plantae
- Clade: Tracheophytes
- Clade: Angiosperms
- Clade: Monocots
- Order: Asparagales
- Family: Orchidaceae
- Subfamily: Epidendroideae
- Genus: Encyclia
- Species: E. plicata

Binomial name
- Encyclia plicata (Lindl.) Schltr.

Synonyms
- Epidendrum plicatum Lindl. (basionym)

= Encyclia plicata =

Species of orchid

Encyclia plicata is a species of orchid. It is a pseudobulbous epiphyte native to Cuba and the Bahamas. It is native to shrublands and dry forests, where it grows in trees and shrubs and in leaf litter on the ground. Its population is stable in the Bahamas, but the Cuban populations are under pressure from deforestation, quarry mining, residential and tourist development, non-native invasive species, and harvesting for sale to orchid collectors.

The species was first described as Epidendrum plicatum by John Lindley in 1847. In 1914 Rudolf Schlechter renamed the species Encyclia plicata.
