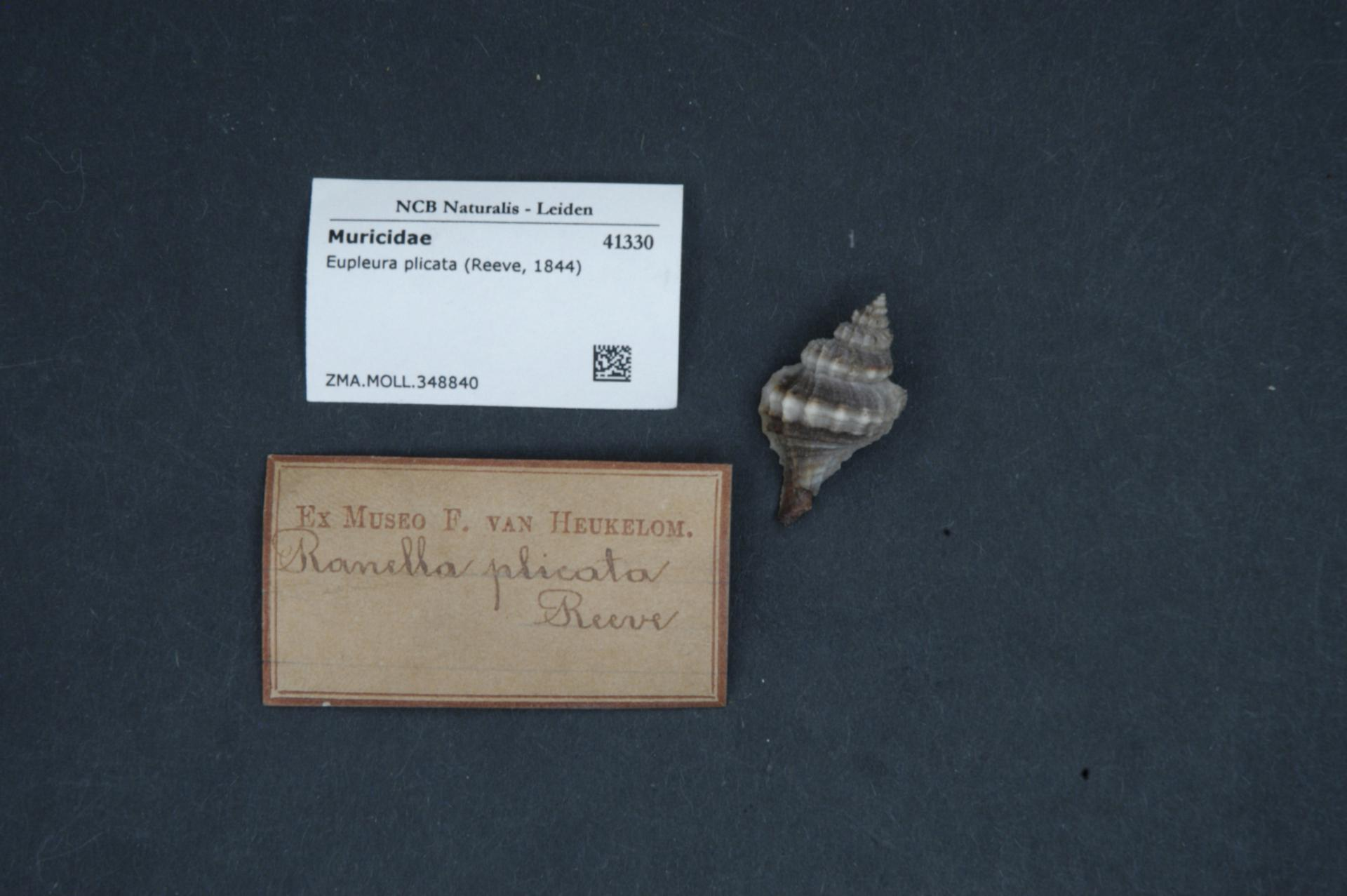
- Shell of a Eupleura plicata

Scientific classification
- Kingdom: Animalia
- Phylum: Mollusca
- Class: Gastropoda
- Subclass: Caenogastropoda
- Order: Neogastropoda
- Family: Muricidae
- Genus: Eupleura
- Species: E. plicata

Binomial name
- Eupleura plicata (Reeve, 1844)

Synonyms
- Ranella plicata Reeve, 1844

= Eupleura plicata =

Species of gastropod

Eupleura plicata is a species of sea snail, a marine gastropod mollusk in the family Muricidae, the murex snails or rock snails.
