= Posterior segment of eyeball =

Back two-thirds of the eye

Posterior segment
- Schematic diagram of the human eye

Details

Identifiers
- Latin: segmentum posterius bulbi oculi
- MeSH: D057972
- FMA: 58868

The posterior segment or posterior cavity is the back two-thirds of the eye that includes the anterior hyaloid membrane and all of the optical structures behind it: the vitreous humor, retina, choroid, and optic nerve. The portion of the posterior segment visible during ophthalmoscopy (or fundoscopy) is sometimes referred to as the posterior pole, or fundus. Some ophthalmologists specialize in the treatment and management of posterior segment disorders and diseases.

In some animals, the retina contains a reflective layer (the tapetum lucidum) which increases the amount of light each photosensitive cell perceives, reflecting the light out of the eye, allowing the animal to see better under low light conditions.

== See also ==
- Anterior segment
- Posterior chamber (of the anterior segment)
- Vitreous chamber
