= Anterior segment of eyeball =

Front third of the eye

- Human eye Anterior Segment - Magnified view seen on examination with a slit lamp under diffuse illumination showing conjunctiva overlying the white sclera, transparent cornea, pharmacologically dilated pupil and cataract

Details

Identifiers
- Latin: segmentum anterius bulbi oculi
- MeSH: D000869

Diagram of anterior segment of a human eye (horizontal section of the right eye): 1. Lens, 2. Zonule of Zinn or ciliary zonule, 3. Posterior chamber and 4. Anterior chamber with 5. Aqueous humour flow; 6. Pupil, 7. Corneosclera with 8. Cornea, 9. Trabecular meshwork and Schlemm's canal. 10. Corneal limbus and 11. Sclera; 12. Conjunctiva, 13. Uvea with 14. Iris, 15. Ciliary body.

The anterior segment or anterior cavity is the front third of the eye that includes the structures in front of the vitreous humour: the cornea, iris, ciliary body, and lens.

Within the anterior segment are two fluid-filled spaces:

- the anterior chamber between the posterior surface of the cornea (i.e. the corneal endothelium) and the iris.
- the posterior chamber between the iris and the front face of the vitreous.

Aqueous humour fills these spaces within the anterior segment and provides nutrients to the surrounding structures.

Some ophthalmologists and optometrists specialize in the treatment and management of anterior segment disorders and diseases.

== See also ==
- Posterior segment
- Toxic anterior segment syndrome
