= Posterior chamber of eyeball =

Region of the eyeball between the iris and lens

Posterior chamber of the eyeball
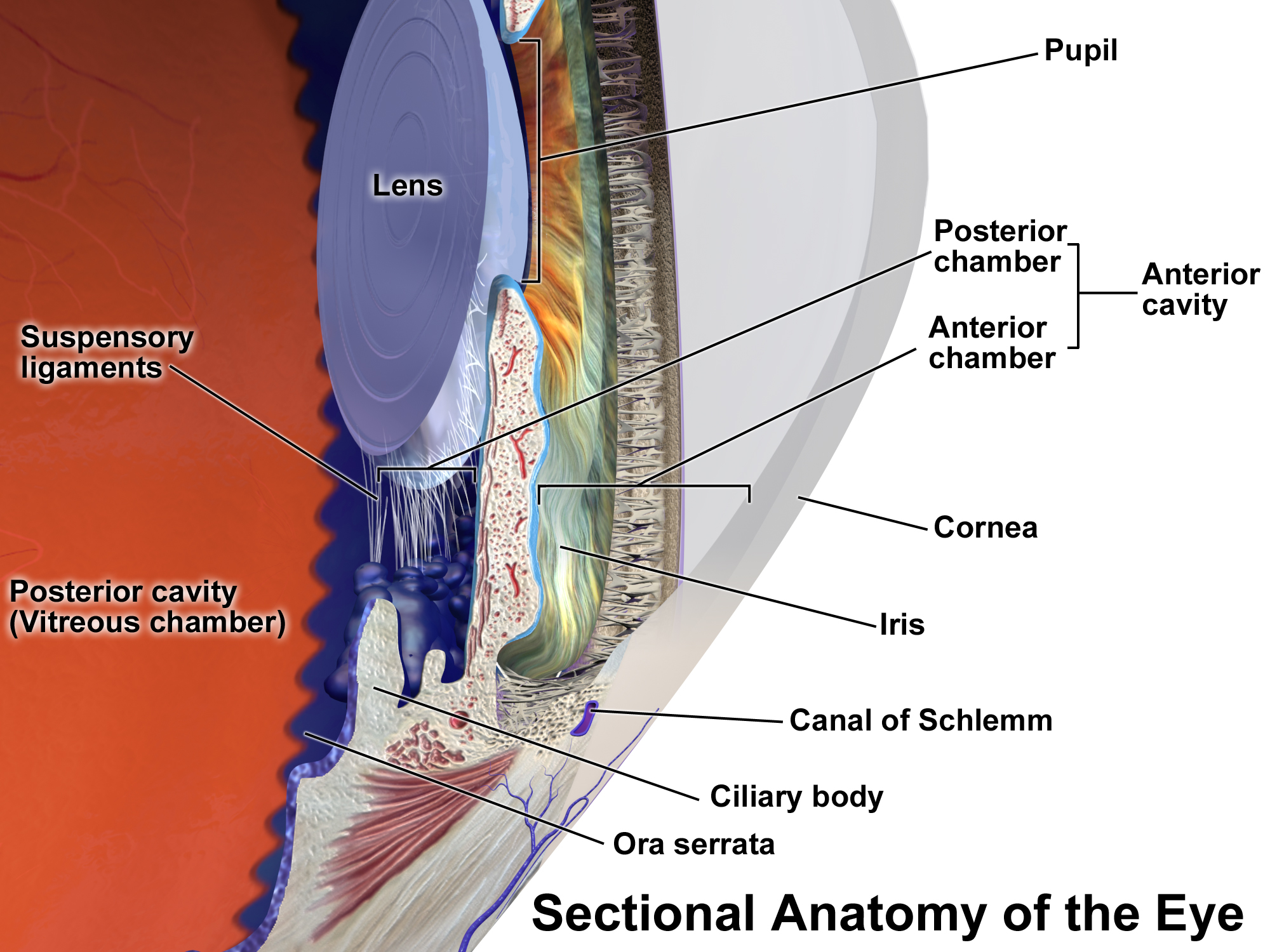
- Anterior part of the human eye, with label of posterior chamber at right.

- Schematic diagram of the human eye (posterior chamber labeled at upper left)

Details

Identifiers
- Latin: camera posterior bulbi oculi
- TA98: A15.2.06.005; A15.2.06.001
- TA2: 6794
- FMA: 58080

The posterior chamber is a narrow space behind the peripheral part of the iris, and in front of the suspensory ligament of the lens and the ciliary processes. The posterior chamber consists of small space directly posterior to the iris but anterior to the lens. The posterior chamber is part of the anterior segment and should not be confused with the vitreous chamber (in the posterior segment).

Posterior chamber is an important structure involved in production and circulation of aqueous humor. Aqueous humor produced by the epithelium of the ciliary body is secreted into the posterior chamber, from which it flows through the pupil to enter the anterior chamber.

The hypermature cataractous lens or, the intraocular lens implanted after cataract surgery may obstruct the aqueous flow through the pupil. The block in flow of aqueous from the posterior to the anterior chamber will lead to a condition known as Iris bombe. In this condition, pressure in the posterior chamber rises, resulting in anterior bowing of the peripheral iris and obstruction of the trabecular meshwork. This may result in an acute attack of angle closure glaucoma. Surgical management of Glaucoma due to Iris bombe include making a small hole in the iris which allows passage of aqueous from posterior chamber to anterior chamber either by YAG or Argon laser iridotomy or by manual iridectomy.

== Additional images ==
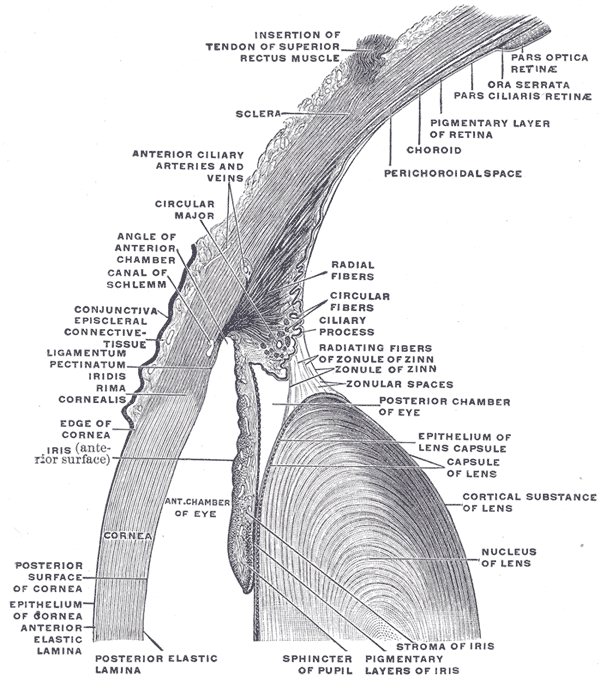
The upper half of a sagittal section through the front of the eyeball (posterior chamber of eye labeled at center right)

== See also ==
- Anterior chamber
- Aqueous humour
- Cataract surgery
- Posterior chamber intraocular lens
