= Shearography =

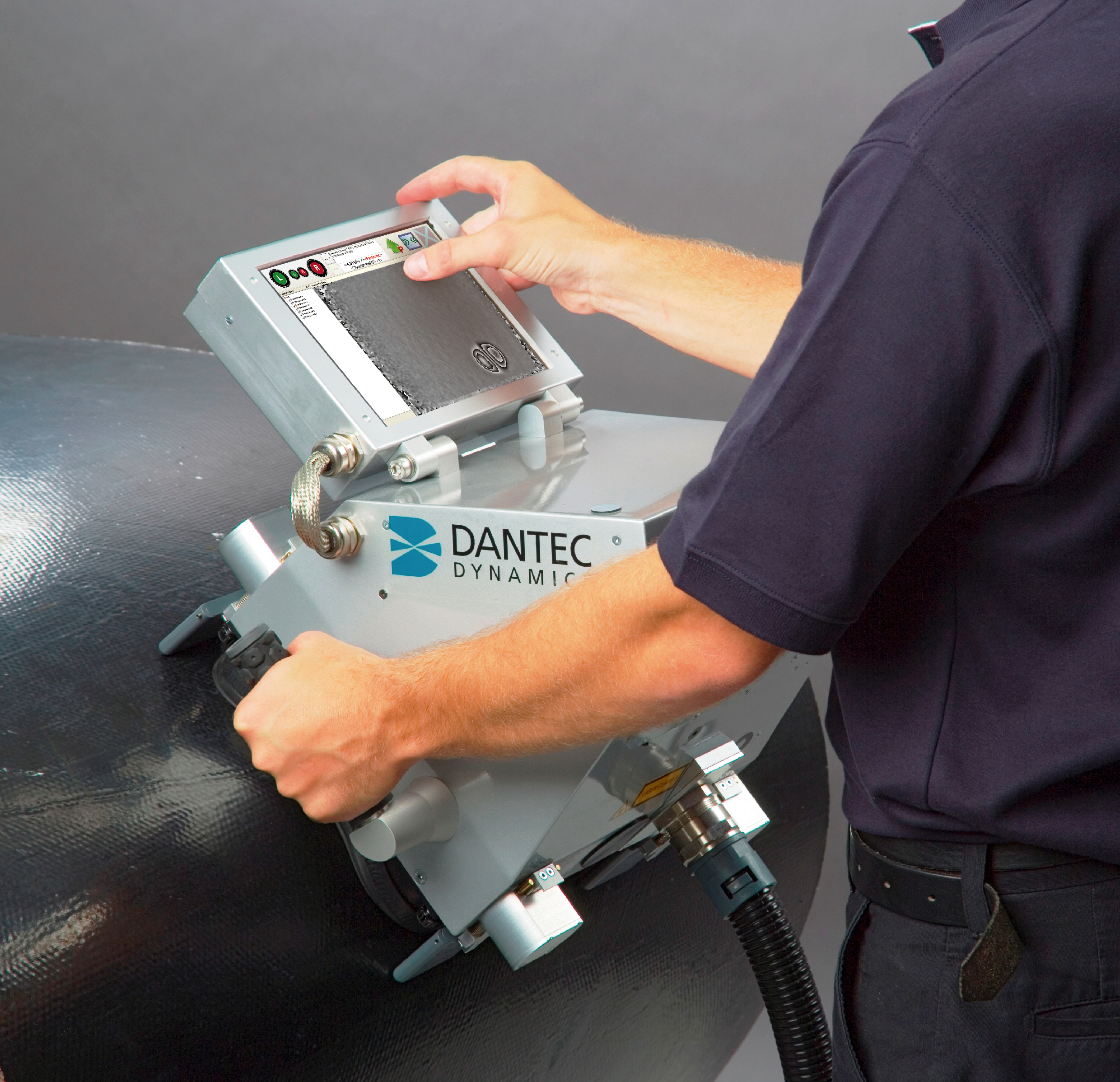
A vacuum shearography hood and data display unit is applied to a composite structure to check for defects. An indication of a possible defect appears as the ripple pattern on the bottom right of the data screen.

Shearography or Speckle pattern shearing interferometry is a measuring and testing method similar to holographic interferometry. It uses coherent light or coherent soundwaves to provide information about the quality of different materials in nondestructive testing, strain measurement, and vibration analysis. Shearography is extensively used in production and development in aerospace, wind rotor blades, automotive, and materials research areas. Advantages of shearography are the large area testing capabilities (up to 1 m^{2} per minute), non-contact properties, its relative insensitivity to environmental disturbances, and its good performance on honeycomb materials, which is a big challenge for traditional nondestructive testing methods.

== Shearing function ==
When a surface area is illuminated with a highly coherent laser light, a stochastical interference pattern is created. This interference pattern is called a speckle, and is projected on a rigid camera's CCD chip. Analogous with Electronic speckle pattern interferometry (ESPI), to obtain results from the speckle we need to compare it with a known reference light. Shearography uses the test object itself as the known reference; it shears the image so a double image is created. The superposition of the two images, a shear image, represents the surface of the test object at this unloaded state. This makes the method much less sensitive to external vibrations and noise. By applying a small load, the material will deform. A nonuniform material quality will generate a nonuniform movement of the surface of the test object. A new shearing image is recorded at the loaded state and is compared with the sheared image before load. If a flaw is present, it will be seen.

== Phase-shift technology ==
To increase the sensitivity of the measurement method, a real-time phase shift process is used in the sensor. This contains a stepping mirror that shifts the reference beam, which is then processed with a best fit-algorithm and presents the information in real time.

== Applications ==
The main applications are in composite nondestructive testing, where typical flaws are: Disbonds, Delaminations, Wrinkles, Porosity, Foreign objects, and Impact damages.

Industries where Shearography is used are: Aerospace, Space, Boats, Wind power, Automotive, Tires, and Art conservation.

== Inspection standards ==
The methodology of shearography is standardized by ASTM International:

- ASTM E2581-07, "Standard Practice for Shearography on Polymer Matrix Composites, Sandwich Core Materials and Filament Wound Pressure Vessel’s in Aerospace Applications"

The following NDT personnel certification documents contain references to shearography:

- BS EN 4179:2009
- NAS 410, 2008 Rev 3
- ASNT SNT-TC-1A, 2006 edition
- ASNT CP-105, 2006 edition
