= Kawasaki YPX =

Japanese proposed twin-engined airliner developed from P-1 maritime patrol aircraft

YPX

General information
- Type: Jet airliner
- National origin: Japan
- Manufacturer: Kawasaki Aerospace Company
- Status: Proposed

History
- Developed from: Kawasaki P-1

The Kawasaki YPX was a twinjet airliner proposed by the Japanese aircraft manufacturer Kawasaki Aerospace Company. It was heavily based on the Kawasaki P-1 maritime patrol aircraft that was developed for the Japan Maritime Self-Defense Force.

As envisioned, the YPX was to have seated between 93 and 150 passengers, and would have contested market share with existing regional airliners from both Bombardier Aviation and Embraer, as well as the smaller Boeing 737 and Airbus A320 family jetliners on short haul routes. Work on the YPX was performed in association with the Japan Aircraft Development Corporation (JADC) and, if the project had received authorisation to proceed, have likely involved various other firms beyond Kawasaki, including Fuji Heavy Industries, Mitsubishi Heavy Industries, and possibly even the Taiwanese aircraft producer Aerospace Industrial Development Corporation.

Market research determined that many prospective customers sought operational savings over incumbent competitors of up to 30 percent; Kawasaki had internally aimed to achieve a 15 percent operating cost reduction in comparison to the Boeing 737-700. It was recognised that substantial design work, including the adoption of a twin-engine configuration instead of the P-1's quad-engine arrangement, would have been necessary to produce a viable airliner. Development of the YPX was paused during the early 2010s and there has been no progress as of 2024. No known prototype has been built.

== Design and development ==
During the 2000s, Kawasaki Heavy Industries was conducting intense market studies and initial design work for its own prospective airliner, referred to as the YPX; it was envisioned to seat between 93 and 150 passengers and to be competitive with existing regional airliners, such as the Bombardier CSeries, and to even be a challengers to the narrowbody airliners of both Airbus and Boeing. Specifically, Kawasaki stated that, in comparison to the Boeing 737-700, the firm aimed to achieve a 15 percent reduction in operating costs. A key aspect of the aircraft's design towards making such savings was that the preliminary specification, in contrast to the regional airliners produced by both Bombardier Aviation and Embraer, the YPX would be a substantially lighter aircraft and thus require correspondingly lower amounts of thrust.

According to preliminary specifications issued in 2007, the base model YPX-11 was to have seated 113 passengers in a two-class arrangement. The YPX-10 was to have seated 93 in two classes while the YPX-12 was to have accommodated 137, implying about 150 in an all-economy arrangement. Standard range for all three body lengths would have been 4,260 km (2,300 nautical miles) but the YPX-10 and YPX-11 were to have extended-range sub-variants flying as far as 5,930 km (3,200 nautical miles). The YPX was to have a five-abreast economy cabin and an elliptical cross-section - that is, with a smoothly varying radius, rather than the old double-bubble based on two distinct radii. Economy seats would be 46 cm (18 in) wide; the aisle, 51 cm (20 in). Various elements of the YPX, including the wing box and empennage, would have been incorporated without any major changes from the Kawasaki P-1 maritime patrol aircraft.

While Kawasaki led the YPX initiative, it was conducted in association with Japan's state-sponsored aerospace industrial coordination organisation, the Japan Aircraft Development Corporation (JADC). It was expected that, if the project was given the go-ahead, numerous other Japanese aircraft manufacturers, including Fuji Heavy Industries and Mitsubishi Heavy Industries, were highly likely to be involved in the later-stage development and manufacture of the YPX. Furthermore, roughly one year after the programme's envisioned launch, it was expected that approaches to prospective operators could formally commence, and that within four years of launch, the first prototype YPX would perform its maiden flight. It was also forecast that the flight test programme would be relatively rapid, permitting the type's entry to revenue service in under two years following the first flight. Under a timeline that was publicly disclosed in 2008, the YPX's entry into service date could occur as early as 2015. However, other statements from Kawasaki that same year gave a tentative service entry date around 2018-2019.

It was also speculated that other Asian aerospace manufacturers, such as the Taiwanese firm Aerospace Industrial Development Corporation (AIDC), could become partners on the YPX project if it were merged with a separate proposal made by Tokyo Governor Shintaro Ishihara for the development of a multi-national Asian airliner.

However, various uncertainties remained in the late 2000s. Specifically, no engine selection had not been announced. Additionally, market research conducted during the late 2000s determined that airlines would typically require substantial greater savings before they would back a new entrant to the market; European carriers reportedly sought at least a 30 percent reduction in operating costs. Political and competitive constraints on the YPX initiative also existed as, while JADC would have been resistive to any shrinkage that would cause it to overlap with the then-in development Mitsubishi Regional Jet (seating between 76 and 92 passengers), Kawasaki would have likely also sought to avoid expanding the prospective airliner to the extent that it would result in head-to-head competition with both Airbus and Boeing airliners in a larger size category.

During 2012, the Ministry of Defense and Kawasaki Heavy Industries pointed out that "a passenger aircraft based almost entirely on the XP-1 would have little marketability, and would require significant design changes that would be almost completely new, making it difficult to justify." Civilian aircraft of this class are usually twin-engine aircraft due to cost and fuel efficiency considerations, and the Ministry of Defense's documents show a conceptual drawing of a twin-engine aircraft, but the prototype P-1 is equipped with four domestically produced turbofan engines at the request of the Japan Maritime Self-Defense Force, and would require significant modifications. On 26 March 2013, Kawasaki commented that there had not been any "no concrete moves" to convert the P-1 into a passenger aircraft. Into the mid 2010s, the YPX was still being mentioned as a speculative project.

== Specifications ==
General characteristics

- Crew: 2
- Capacity: 100-150 passengers

Performance

- Maximum speed: 885 km/h (550 mph, 478 kn)
- Range: 4,260 km (2,650 mi, 2,300 nmi)
- Service ceiling: 11,900 m (39,000 ft)

== See also ==
Related development

- Kawasaki P-1
- Kawasaki C-2

Aircraft of comparable role, configuration, and era

- Airbus A320 family
- Boeing 737 Next Generation
- Bombardier CSeries
- Comac ARJ21
- Embraer E-Jet E2 family
- Sukhoi Superjet family
- Mitsubishi MRJ

Related lists

- List of civil aircraft
