= Espi =

ESPI may refer to:

- Carlos Espi, Spanish footballer
- Electronic speckle pattern interferometry
- Enhanced Serial Peripheral Interface Bus (eSPI), a synchronous serial communication protocol
- European Space Policy Institute (fr:Institut européen de Politique Spatiale)
