= Biospeckle laser tool library =

The biospeckle laser tool library, or BSLTL, is a free project to help researchers to work with dynamic speckle. The library is based on Mcode to GNU Octave and Matlab and in the free ebook A Practical Guide to Biospeckle Laser Analysis: Theory and Software.

== Biospeckle laser ==
Biospeckle laser is the nomination of dynamic speckle when the application is based on biological material.

== Mcode Library ==
The library based on Mcode is useful in GNU Octave and in Matlab, and it can be found in a free project

== See also ==
- Speckle pattern
- Speckle noise
- Speckle imaging
