= Japanese arms-export ban =

De facto law governing exports of military hardware outside of Japan

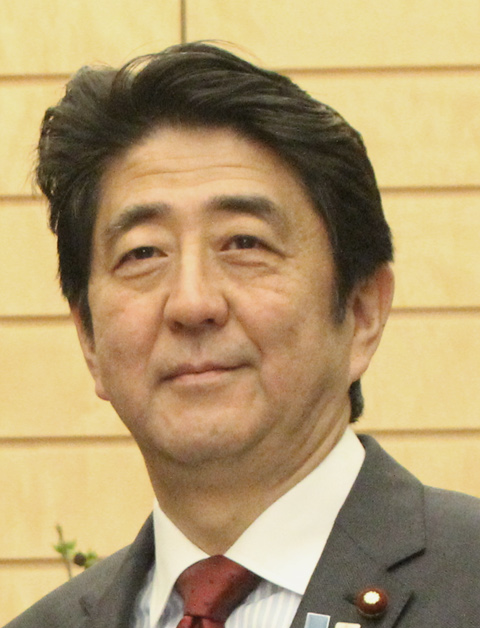
The easing of arms restriction happened during Shinzo Abe's second term as prime minister.

The Japanese arms-export ban, known as the Three Arms Exports Ban, was a de facto law that governed Japanese export of military hardware outside of the country. The export ban was eased on 1 April 2014 by Shinzo Abe during his second term as prime minister. On 21 April 2026, Prime Minister Sanae Takaichi lifted the post-war ban.

The basis of the ban was the Three Principles on Arms Exports (Japanese: 武器輸出三原則, romanized: Buki-yushutsu-sangensoku) adopted by the National Diet of Japan in 1967 dealing with situations in which arms could not be exported from Japan. The three principles were that arms exports were not allowed to go to:

1. Communist bloc countries
2. Countries under arms-exports embargo under United Nations Security Council resolutions
3. Countries involved in or likely to be involved in international conflicts

On 1 April 2014, the government of Prime Minister Shinzo Abe ended the ban on arms exports under the Three Principles on Arms Exports and set out the Three Principles on Transfer of Defense Equipment and Technology (Japanese: 防衛装備移転三原則, romanized: Bōei-sōbi-iten-sangensoku) and the "Implementation Guidelines" for the new Three Principles according to the 2013 National Security Strategy of Japan adopted on 17 December 2013.

== History ==
=== After World War II ===
After the end of World War II, Japan exported some Mitsubishi Type 73 light truck (Kyū) jeeps to the Philippines and to South Vietnam. These vehicles were mostly provided through US foreign aid.

=== Vietnam war ===
During the Vietnam War in the 1960s, as in the Korean War of the 1950s, Japan supplied a substantial volume of materials to American forces. In 1966, a report from the Xinhua News Agency stated that as much as 92% of the napalm deployed in Vietnam was allegedly manufactured in Japan, with the Nippon Yushi Corporation, based in Aichi Prefecture, identified as the likely manufacturer. The company denied it was producing napalm, but the secretary-general of the plant's union stated that "almost anyone" could produce napalm using the chemicals produced by the company.

Mainichi Shimbun found no proof that napalm bombs were being produced in Japan, but in 1966 the United States did ask for 4,000 Korean War-era napalm bombs at a former US Air Force base to be handed back.

=== Tightening of restrictions ===
In 1976, the government of Japan announced that arms exports not restricted by the three principles would also be restrained. Aside from some technology transfers to the United States, Japan banned all arms exports. However, after the Japan Air Self-Defense Force retired their Lockheed F-104J/DJ Starfighter aircraft, thirty-six of them were provided to the Taiwanese Air Force.

=== Exceptions before 2014 ===
==== Maritime patrol boat exports ====
Tokyo has granted exceptions for exporting Japanese-made patrol boats. The Japanese Ministry of Foreign Affairs justified its case by providing ODA assistance to Indonesia for securing the Strait of Malacca in June 2003 and February 2004. As these boats were made with bulletproof material, it falls under military vessels under the Export Trade Control Ordinance. An agreement with Jakarta was necessary to ensure that the boats would not be exported to another country and would be used for anti-piracy and law enforcement purposes. Three patrol boats were made by Sumidagawa Shipyard for the Indonesian National Police's National Police Water Unit. In 2009, a maritime radar system and additional patrol boats were sold to Jakarta.

Other ODA grants were also done with the construction of patrol boats made by Sumidagawa Shipyard for Djibouti, Malaysia and Sri Lanka.

==== Soryu submarines ====
In October 2012, Japan made moves to sell Sōryū-class submarines to Australia. The deal was never consummated.

==== 2013 UNMISS Sudan incident ====
South Korean soldiers in Bor, South Sudan were aided by JGSDF soldiers deployed to South Sudan as part of UNMISS when ammunition supplies were exhausted during an attack from December 19 to 22, 2013. During a National Security Council meeting, they ruled that JGSDF forces should provide ammunition to their South Korean counterparts. This aid was a "Contribution in Kind" scenario, which went unused and was returned.

=== Abe abates restrictions ===
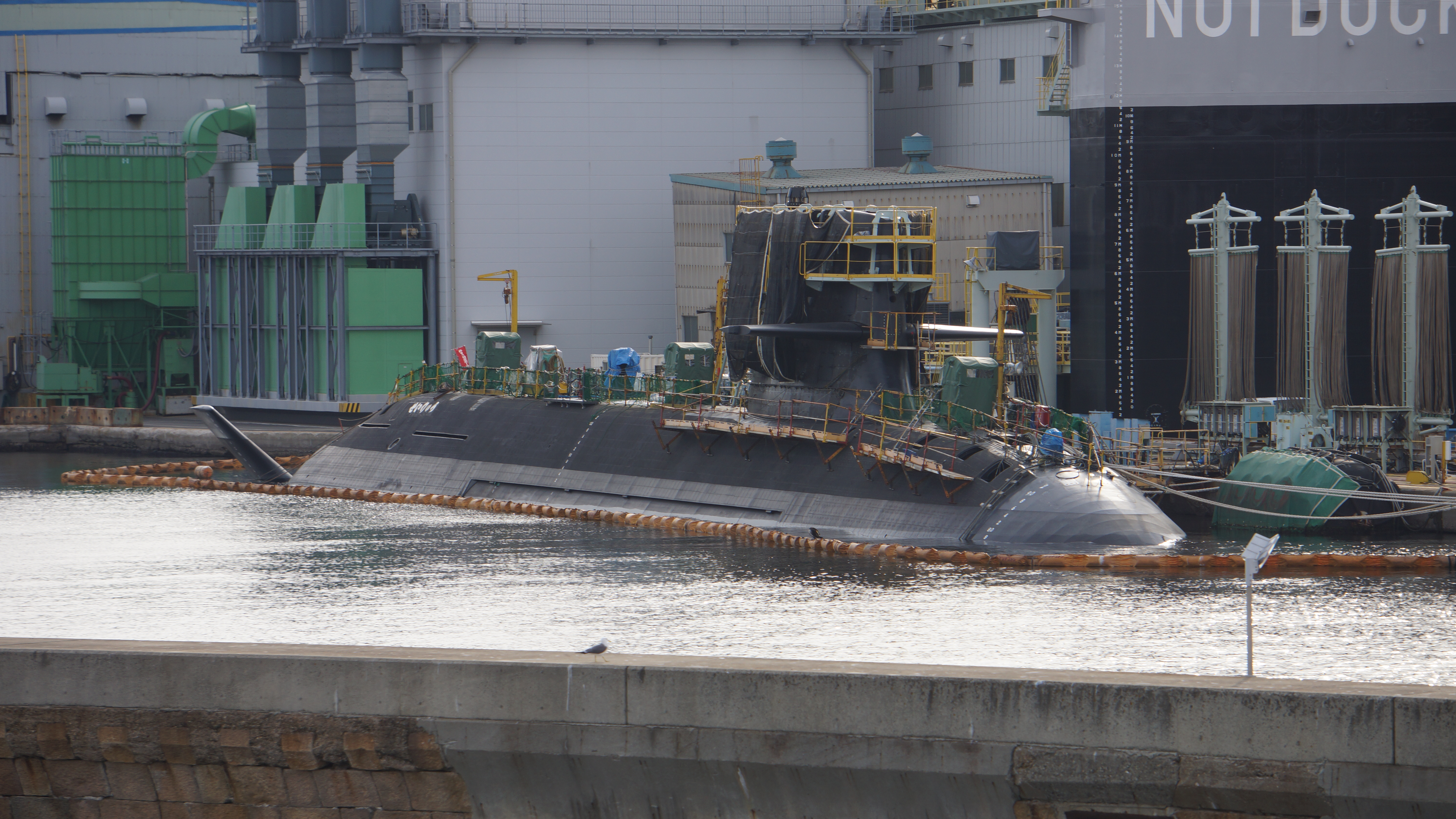
JS Seiryū

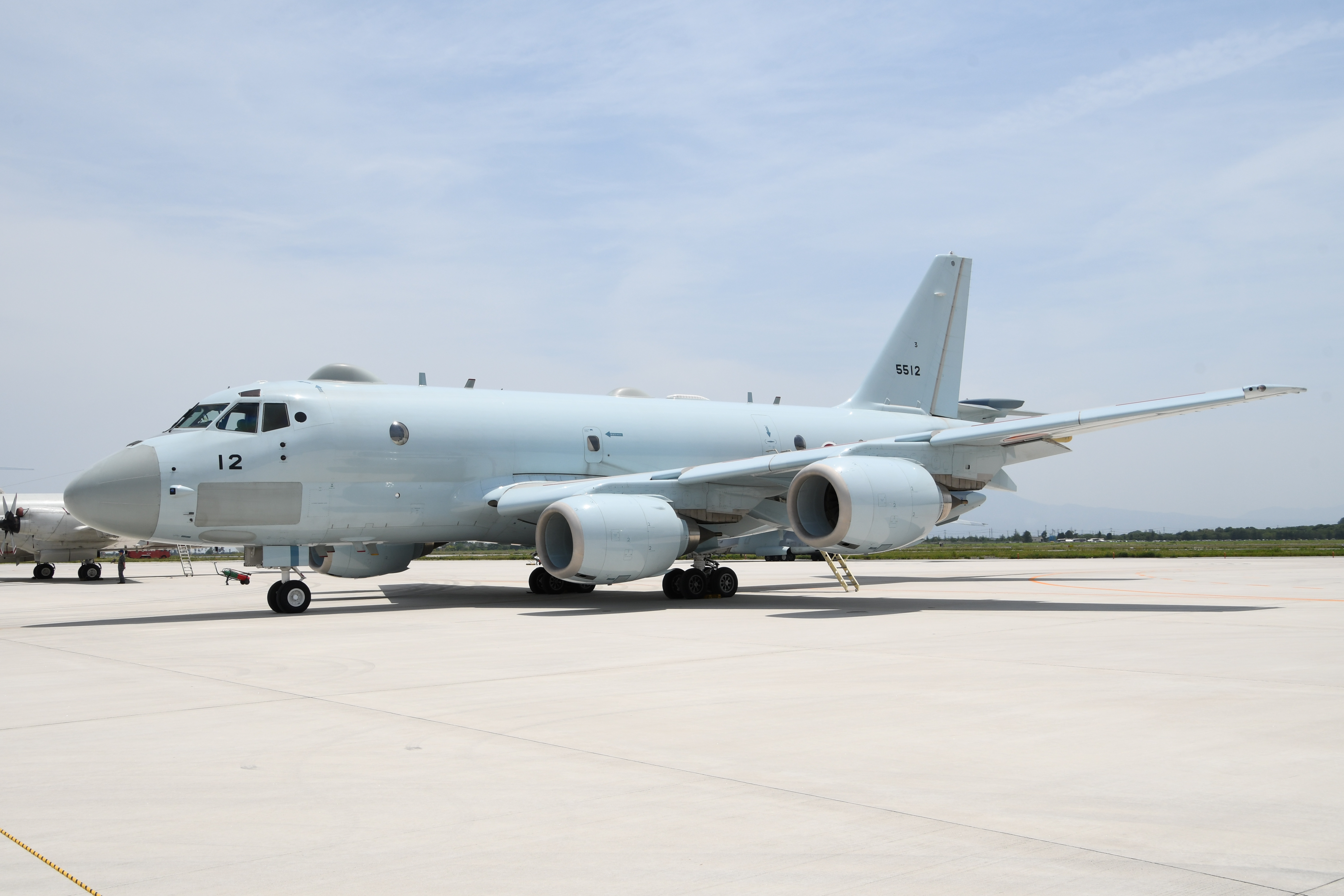
Kawasaki P-1

On 1 April 2014, the government of Prime Minister Shinzo Abe ended the ban on arms exports under the Three Principles on Arms Exports and set out the Three Principles on Transfer of Defense Equipment and Technology (Japanese: 防衛装備移転三原則, romanized: Bōei-sōbi-iten-sangensoku) and the "Implementation Guidelines" for the new Three Principles according to the 2013 National Security Strategy of Japan adopted on 17 December 2013.

=== Effect of abatement policy ===
Following this abatement, in 2015 Japan made moves to sell Kawasaki P-1 maritime patrol aircraft to the United Kingdom and New Zealand, but these attempts were not successful.

In 2017, the SDF Law was amended to allow the sale of JSDF equipment at prices lower than the JSDF's original purchase price.

On 6 November 2022, it was reported that Tokyo had considered the exports of used JSDF main battle tanks (MBTs) and missile systems to friendly countries, and on 4 January 2023, it was reported that the government considered allowing military hardware that has dual use, such as radars or dual-use ports, to friendly countries, and included the export for UN peacekeeping or humanitarian operations as a possibility.

On December 7, 2023, it was reported that the LDP agreed to expand the rules on providing Ukraine with military equipment based on the guidelines. They also agreed to permanently allow all non-lethal equipment to be exported.

=== Efforts to abolish restrictions ===
On December 3, 2025, it was reported that Tokyo could take steps to remove more restrictions to market other arms in 2026 in order to fully boost the local defense industry.

=== Lifting restrictions ===
On April 21, 2026, the Japanese Cabinet lifted the post-war ban. According to Sanae Takaichi, she noted that providing military hardware to "meet the needs of like-minded nations will contribute to enhancing their defense capabilities".

== Arms exports ==
=== Australia ===
On 5 August 2025, the New FFM was selected under the Australian general purpose frigate program to replace the Anzac-class frigate.

=== Bangladesh ===
On 3 February 2026, Bangladesh and Japan signed a formal agreement to facilitate the transfer of defence equipment and technology. The deal was signed in Dhaka by Lieutenant General S M Kamrul Hassan, the Principal Staff Officer of the Armed Forces Division of Bangladesh, and Saida Shinichi, the Japanese Ambassador to Bangladesh. This agreement establishes a legal framework that governs the handling and transfer of military equipment between the two nations. It includes strict provisions to prevent the unauthorized diversion of transferred technology to third parties or for unintended purposes. The pact is part of a broader effort to upgrade the bilateral relationship, which was elevated to a "Strategic Partnership" in 2023. Japanese officials stated that the agreement will support joint projects contributing to international peace and security while strengthening Japan's defense industrial base.

=== India ===
As early as 2014, efforts are made to sell the ShinMaywa US-2 military flying boats to India. As of 2021, the deal was stalled due to disagreements on price.

On 15 October 2022, the Second Kishida Cabinet (Reshuffled) announced that they would sell the Unicorn stealth antenna technology to the Indian military. On August 21, 2024, a plan was agreed to transfer the Unicorn antenna during a 2+2 meeting in New Delhi with Indian and Japanese defense/foreign ministers. On August 27, 2024, it was confirmed that the transfer will proceed. In July 2026, India announced that production of the Unicorn will be localized.

=== Indonesia ===
Patrol boats were donated to Indonesia in June 2006 before the ban was eased.

In 2015, it's reported that Indonesia has considered the ShinMaywa US-2.

In November 2020 it was reported that Japan planned to export four Mogami-class frigates to Indonesia, with another four to be built in Indonesia under a ¥300 billion contract. As of August 2024, the Indonesian Navy acquired two Arrowhead 140 frigates and six FREMM frigates.

In June 2023, there is consideration to provide Indonesia with used F-15 engines for the F-16s used in the Indonesian Air Force.

In May 2026, there are talks between Jakarta and Tokyo for potentially transferring the Asagiri-class ships to the Indonesian Navy.

=== Philippines ===
In 2016, it was reported that the JMSDF planned to lease at least five TC-90 aircraft to the Philippines to conduct maritime patrols. From November 2016 to November 2017, six Philippine Navy pilots were trained to fly the aircraft at Tokushima Airport. Maintenance staff were also trained. Two aircraft were transferred free of charge in March 2017, and three more were to be transferred in 2018. The aircraft were ultimately donated rather than leased.

The JGSDF retired its Bell UH-1 helicopters in 2012. The Philippines had planned to buy 16 new Bell 412 EPI helicopters from Canada, but the deal collapsed because the Trudeau government was concerned about how the helicopters would be used. In 2017, Japan offered to supply around 40,000 spare parts for UH-1H aircraft to the Philippines. In 2018, it was announced that Japan would supply the parts to the Philippines free of charge. In March 2019, it was reported that an initial delivery of parts to the Philippine Air Force had been made and more parts were to arrive in August 2019.

According to Defense Secretary Delfin Lorenzana, the Philippines is the first ASEAN nation to get military equipment from Japan.

On 4 October 2022, it was announced that an aerial surveillance radar under a contract by Mitsubishi Electric had been completed and will be delivered; this is based on a bid won in March 2020 to provide the FPS-3 and TPS-P14 radar system.

On 19 December 2022, the Second Kishida Cabinet (Reshuffled) announced that Japanese-made UH-1J choppers will be provided to the AFP.

=== New Zealand ===
In January 2017, New Zealand expressed interest in the Kawasaki C-2 aircraft and the Kawasaki P-1 maritime patrol aircraft. The P-8 Poseidon was selected instead of the Kawasaki P-1.

The New Zealand government has reportedly begun talks with Japan in the sidelines of the Indo Pacific 2025 defence expo in Sydney, Australia about a potential acquisition of the "Upgraded Mogami" for the Royal New Zealand Navy (RNZN) as a replacement for their in-service Anzac-class frigates.

=== Thailand ===
In 2016, efforts to sell an air-defense radar manufactured by Mitsubishi to Thailand were unsuccessful.

=== United Arab Emirates ===
As early as 2017, there were attempts to sell the C-2 to the United Arab Emirates.

=== Ukraine ===
On 12 March 2023, the Second Kishida Cabinet (Reshuffled) was reported to be considering to send M270s MLRS to Kyiv. On December 7, 2023, the LDP agreed to revise guideline on providing the Ukrainian military with defense equipment.

Type 88 ballistic helmets were sent to Ukraine as military assistance in 2022 during the Russian invasion of Ukraine.

=== United States ===
Two retired MH-53E helicopters of the Japan Maritime Self-Defense Force were sold to the United States Navy in 2015 for their components. The United States was running short of parts for its own fleet of the aging aircraft.

On December 24, 2018, it was announced that Tokyo was seriously considering selling their F-15s to Washington in order to acquire funds to purchase F-35s. Washington would consider selling the F-15s to friendly countries with weak air forces.

=== Vietnam ===
In 2016, Vietnam made informal inquiries on purchasing used JMSDF P-3C aircraft.

In 2020, Japan successfully secured a trade agreement with Vietnam, allowing for the export of Japanese military equipment.
