= Eye testing using speckle =

Laser speckle

Laser speckle also known as eye testing using speckle can be employed as a method for conducting a very sensitive eye test.

When a surface is illuminated by a laser beam and is viewed by an observer, a speckle pattern is formed on the retina. If the observer has perfect vision, the image of the surface is also formed on the retina, and movement of the head will result in the speckle pattern and the surface moving together so that the speckle pattern remains stationary with respect to the background.

If the observer is near-sighted, the image of the surface is formed in front of the retina. Since the speckle pattern is perceived by the brain to be on the retina, the effect is of parallax; the speckle pattern appears to be nearer to the eye than the surface and hence moves in the same direction as the surface, but faster than the surface. If the observer is far-sighted, the speckles appear to move in the opposite direction as the surface, since in this case the surface image is focused behind the retina. The apparent speed of motion of the speckles increases with the magnitude of the defect of the eye.

This technique is so sensitive that it can be used to determine changes in the ability of someone to focus through the day.
