= Wingbox =

Aircraft component

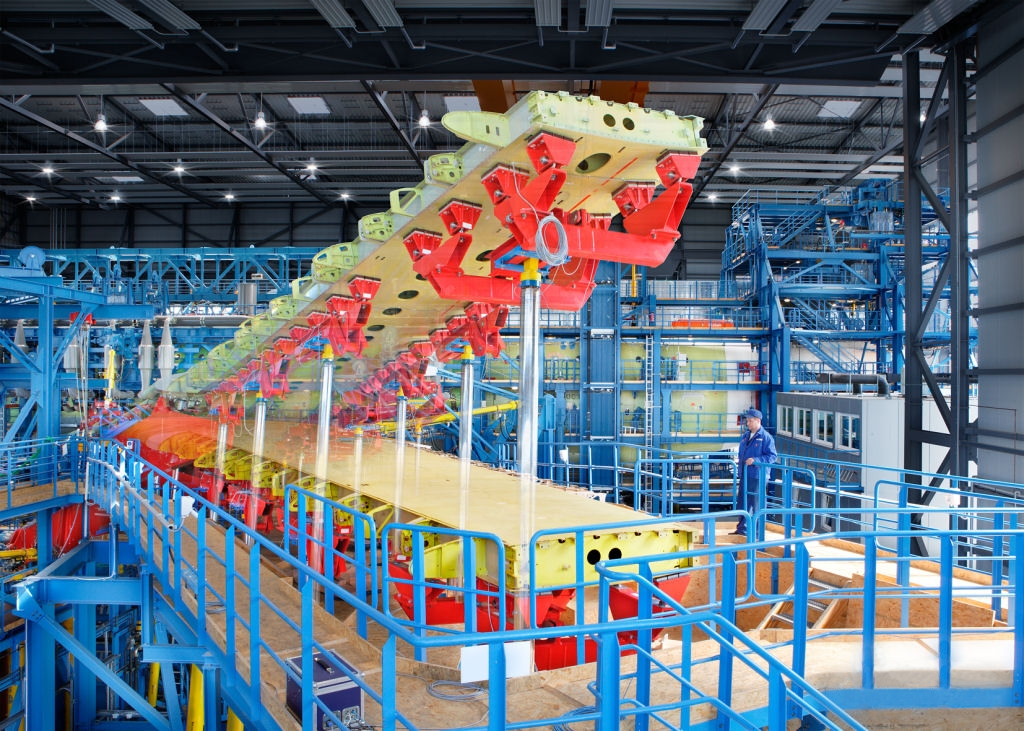
Composite photo of a structural loading test on the left wing box of an Airbus A380, at the IABG company in Dresden

The wingbox of a fixed-wing aircraft is the primary load-carrying structure of the wing, which forms the structural centre of the wings and is also the attachment point for other wing components such as leading edge flaps, swing wings, trailing edge flaps and wing-tip devices. The wingbox continues beyond the visible wing roots and interfaces with the fuselage in the centre wingbox, which forms the structural core of an aircraft.

The wingbox is so called since, on many designs, the combination of the forward and rear wing spars and the upper and lower wing skins together form a natural "box" shape running through the wing. While internal wing structure commonly provides much of the strength via a combination of spars, ribs and stringers, the external skin typically carries a proportion of the loads too. On many aircraft, the inner volume of the wingbox has also been used to store fuel, which is commonly referred to as a wet wing design.

In recent years, there has been an increasing use of composite materials within the wingbox; this trend has largely been pursued to achieve lower weights over designs only using conventional materials. Specifically, carbon fibre has become a popular material due to its very high strength-to-weight ratio. During January 2017, European aerospace conglomerate Airbus Group announced that they had created the world's first single-piece composite center wingbox, stating that it represented a 20 per cent reduction in the cost of manufacturing by being easier to assemble.

== Evaluating and testing ==
Due to its crucial structural role, the wingbox is subjected to considerable analysis and scrutiny in order to be certain of its capabilities, as well to achieve optimum performance. As such, various techniques to calculate and verify the stresses involved have been devised by aerospace engineers and employed by aircraft manufacturers. The use of increasingly capable calculations and tests has been directly credited with enabling the production of lighter and more efficient wings. Towards the latter part of the twentieth century, the use of computer aided design (CAD) technology became commonplace in aerospace programmes; as such, software packages such as CATIA play a major role in the design and manufacturing process.

Furthermore, physical verification of the structural performance of the wingbox is normally demanded in the certification process of civil airliners by the certification authorities. Accordingly, it is commonplace for aircraft manufacturers to produce non-flying test units which are subjected to ground-based testing, exerting loads of up to 1.5 times the maximum aerodynamic forces expected to be encountered at any point throughout its operating life. Destructive testing of wing elements has been around since the earliest days of aviation, although the specific techniques employed have become increasingly sophisticated, particularly since the invention of the strain gauge in 1938, which has been in widespread use within the aerospace industry since the Second World War.

Non-destructive testing is also performed not only during the initial certification process but often throughout an individual aircraft's life to safeguard against fatigue failure and inspect potential damage inflicted. Common techniques include visual inspection, ultrasonic testing, radiographic testing, electromagnetic testing, acoustic emissions, and shearography. Sometimes, via such techniques, the need to replace an individual aircraft's wingbox is identified; although this is a quite intensive and costly procedure, leading to operators often choosing to end an aircraft's operating life instead, such replacements are occasionally performed. During Summer 2019, the United States Air Force was compelled to ground over 100 of its Lockheed Martin C-130 Hercules transport aircraft for inspection and remedial work upon discovering excessive wingbox cracking. Aircraft intended for lengthy service lives have often received replacement wingboxes as a part of life extension programmes.

== See also ==
- Index of aviation articles
