= Speckle (interference) =

Type of image noise

Speckle, speckle pattern, or speckle noise designates the granular structure observed in coherent light, resulting from random interference. Speckle patterns are used in a wide range of metrology techniques, as they generally allow high sensitivity and simple setups. They can also be a limiting factor in imaging systems, such as radar, synthetic aperture radar (SAR), medical ultrasound and optical coherence tomography. Speckle is not external noise; rather, it is an inherent fluctuation in diffuse reflections, because the scatterers are not identical for each cell, and the coherent illumination wave is highly sensitive to small variations in phase changes.

Speckle patterns arise when coherent light is randomised. The simplest case of such randomisation is when light reflects off an optically rough surface. Optically rough means that the surface profile contains fluctuations larger than the wavelength. Most common surfaces are rough to visible light, such as paper, wood, or paint.

The vast majority of surfaces, synthetic or natural, are extremely rough on the scale of the wavelength. We see the origin of this phenomenon if we model our reflectivity function as an array of scatterers. Because of the finite resolution, at any time we are receiving from a distribution of scatterers within the resolution cell. These scattered signals add coherently; that is, they add constructively and destructively depending on the relative phases of each scattered waveform. Speckle results from these patterns of constructive and destructive interference shown as bright and dark dots in the image.

Speckle in conventional radar increases the mean grey level of a local area. Speckle in SAR is generally serious, causing difficulties for image interpretation. It is caused by coherent processing of backscattered signals from multiple distributed targets. In SAR oceanography, for example, speckle is caused by signals from elementary scatterers, the gravity-capillary ripples, and manifests as a pedestal image, beneath the image of the sea waves.

The speckle can also represent some useful information, particularly when it is linked to the laser speckle and to the dynamic speckle phenomenon, where the changes of the spatial speckle pattern over time can be used as a measurement of the surface's activity, such as which is useful for measuring displacement fields via digital image correlation.

== History ==
Although scientists have investigated this phenomenon since the time of Newton, speckles have come into prominence since the invention of the laser.

== Formation ==
The speckle effect is a result of the interference of many waves of the same frequency, having different phases and amplitudes, which add together to give a resultant wave whose amplitude, and therefore intensity, varies randomly. If we model each wave by a vector, we can then see that if we add a number of vectors with random angles together, the length of the resulting vector can be anything from zero to the sum of the individual vector lengths—a 2-dimensional random walk, sometimes known as a drunkard's walk. In the limit of many interfering waves, and for polarised waves, the distribution of intensities (which go as the square of the vector's length) becomes exponential $P(I) = \frac{1}{\langle I \rangle} \exp\left(\frac{-I}{\langle I \rangle}\right)$, where $\langle I \rangle$ is the mean intensity.

When a surface is illuminated by a light wave, according to diffraction theory, each point on an illuminated surface acts as a source of secondary spherical waves. The light at any point in the scattered light field is made up of waves which have been scattered from each point on the illuminated surface. If the surface is rough enough to create path-length differences exceeding one wavelength, giving rise to phase changes greater than 2π, the amplitude, and hence the intensity, of the resultant light varies randomly.

If light of low coherence (i.e., made up of many wavelengths) light source is used, a speckle pattern will not normally be observed, because the speckle patterns produced by individual wavelengths have different dimensions and will normally average one another out. However, we can observe speckle patterns in polychromatic light in some conditions, such as with partially coherent light, or spatially coherent light.

== Types ==
=== Subjective speckles ===
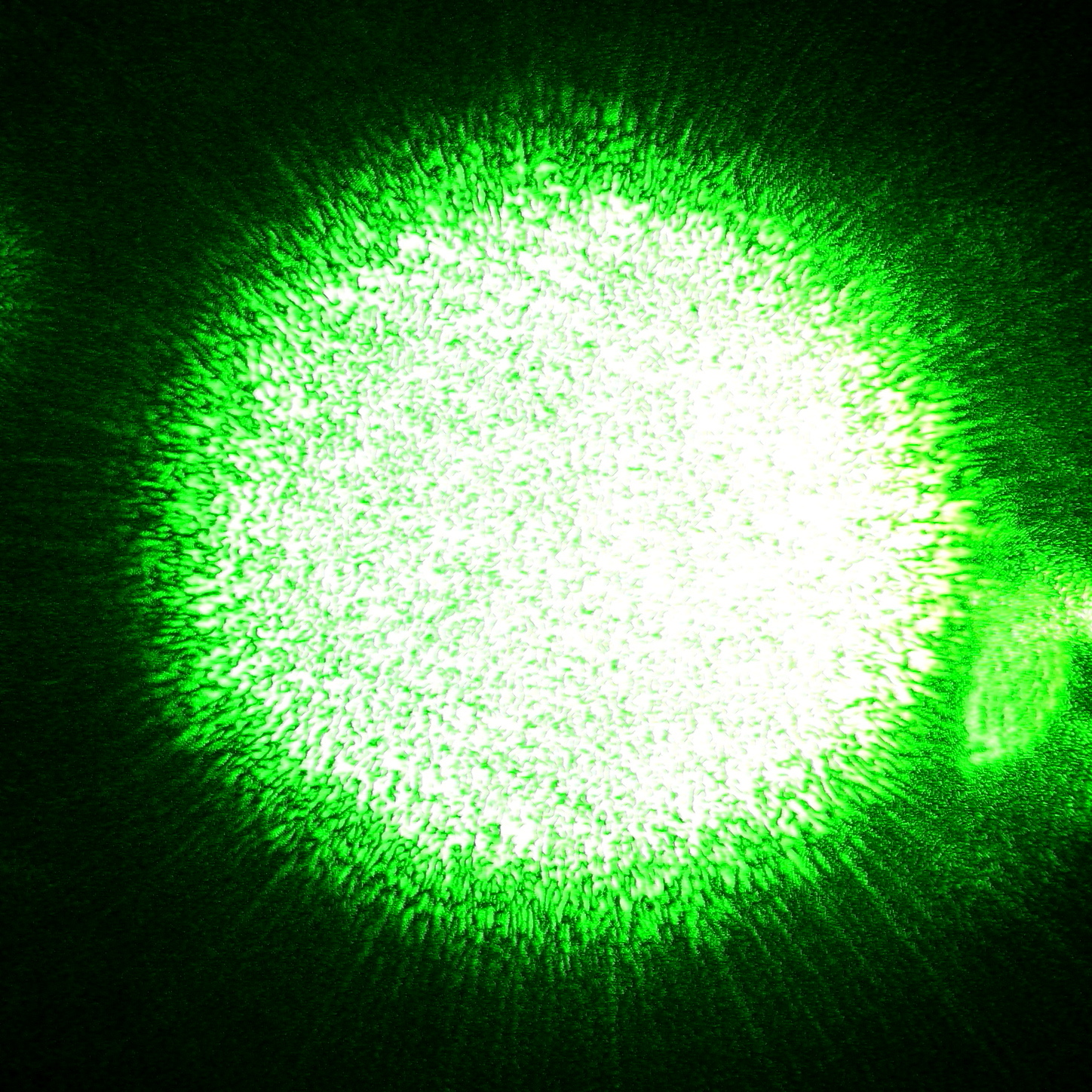
Laser speckle on a digital camera image from a green laser pointer. This is a subjective speckle pattern. (Note that the color differences in the image are introduced by limitations of the camera system.)

When a rough surface which is illuminated by a coherent light (e.g. a laser beam) is imaged, a speckle pattern is observed in the image plane; this is called a "subjective speckle pattern" – see image above. It is called "subjective" because the detailed structure of the speckle pattern depends on the viewing system parameters; for instance, if the size of the lens aperture changes, the size of the speckles change. If the position of the imaging system is altered, the pattern will gradually change and will eventually be unrelated to the original speckle pattern.

We can explain this as follows. We can consider each point in the image to be illuminated by a finite area in the object. We determine the size of this area by the diffraction-limited resolution of the lens which is given by the Airy disk whose diameter is 2.4λu/D, where λ is the wavelength of the light, u is the distance between the object and the lens, and D is the diameter of the lens aperture. (This is a simplified model of diffraction-limited imaging.)

The light at neighboring points in the image has been scattered from areas which have many points in common and the intensity of two such points will not differ much. However, two points in the image which are illuminated by areas in the object which are separated by the diameter of the Airy disk, have light intensities which are unrelated. This corresponds to a distance in the image of 2.4λv/D where v is the distance between the lens and the image. Thus, the "size" of the speckles in the image is of this order.

We can observe the change in speckle size with lens aperture by looking at a laser spot on a wall directly, and then through a very small hole. The speckles will be seen to increase significantly in size. Also, the speckle pattern itself will change when moving the position of the eye while keeping the laser pointer steady. A further proof that the speckle pattern is formed only in the image plane (in the specific case the eye's retina) is that the speckles will stay visible if the eye's focus is shifted away from the wall (this is different for an objective speckle pattern, where the speckle visibility is lost under defocusing).

=== Objective speckles ===
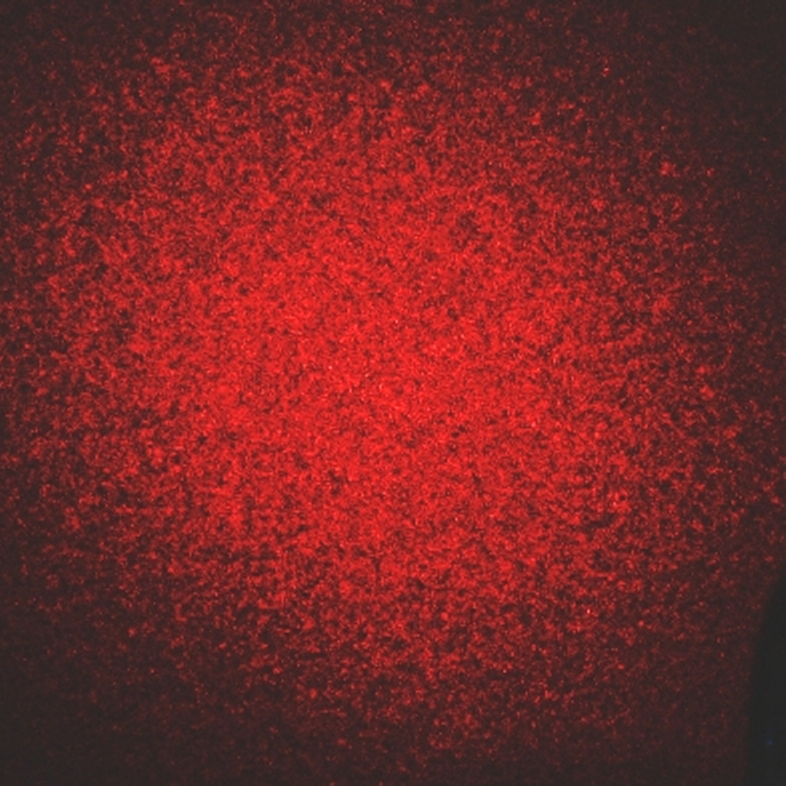
A photograph of an objective speckle pattern. This is the light field formed when a laser beam was scattered from a plastic surface onto a wall.

When laser light which has been scattered off a rough surface falls on another surface, it forms an "objective speckle pattern". If a photographic plate or another 2-D optical sensor is located within the scattered light field without a lens, a speckle pattern is obtained whose characteristics depend on the geometry of the system and the wavelength of the laser. The speckle pattern in the figure was obtained by pointing a laser beam at the surface of a mobile phone so that the scattered light fell onto an adjacent wall. A photograph was then taken of the speckle pattern formed on the wall. Strictly speaking, this also has a second subjective speckle pattern but its dimensions are much smaller than the objective pattern so it is not seen in the image.

Contributions from the whole of the scattering surface make up the light at a given point in the speckle pattern. The relative phases of these scattered waves vary across the scattering surface, so that the resulting phase on each point of the second surface varies randomly. The pattern is the same regardless of how it is imaged, just as if it were a painted pattern.

The "size" of the speckles is a function of the wavelength of the light, the size of the laser beam which illuminates the first surface, and the distance between this surface and the surface where the speckle pattern is formed. This is the case because when the angle of scattering changes such that the relative path difference between light scattered from the centre of the illuminated area compared with light scattered from the edge of the illuminated area changes by λ, the intensity becomes uncorrelated. Dainty derives an expression for the mean speckle size as λz/L where L is the width of the illuminated area and z is the distance between the object and the location of the speckle pattern.

==== Near-field speckles ====
Objective speckles are usually obtained in the far field (also called Fraunhofer region, that is the zone where Fraunhofer diffraction happens). This means that they are generated "far" from the object that emits or scatters light. We can also observe speckles close to the scattering object, in the near field (also called Fresnel region, that is, the region where Fresnel diffraction happens). We call this kind of speckles near-field speckles. See near and far field for a more rigorous definition of "near" and "far".

The statistical properties of a far-field speckle pattern (i.e., the speckle form and dimension) depend on the form and dimension of the region hit by laser light. By contrast, a very interesting feature of near field speckles is that their statistical properties are closely related to the form and structure of the scattering object: objects that scatter at high angles generate small near field speckles, and vice versa. Under Rayleigh–Gans condition, in particular, speckle dimension mirrors the average dimension of the scattering objects, while, in general, the statistical properties of near field speckles generated by a sample depend on the light scattering distribution.

Actually, the condition under which the near field speckles appear has been described as more strict than the usual Fresnel condition.

== Applications ==
Speckle patterns have been used in a variety of applications in microscopy, imaging, and optical manipulation.

When lasers were first invented, the speckle effect was considered to be a severe drawback in using lasers to illuminate objects, particularly in holographic imaging because of the grainy image produced. Researchers later realized that speckle patterns could carry information about the object's surface deformations, and exploited this effect in holographic interferometry and electronic speckle pattern interferometry. Speckle imaging and eye testing using speckle also use the speckle effect.

Speckle is the chief limitation of coherent lidar and coherent imaging in optical heterodyne detection.

In the case of near field speckles, the statistical properties depend on the light scattering distribution of a given sample. This allows the use of near field speckle analysis to detect the scattering distribution; this is the so-called near-field scattering technique.

When the speckle pattern changes in time, due to changes in the illuminated surface, the phenomenon is known as dynamic speckle, and it can be used to measure activity, by means of, for example, an optical flow sensor (optical computer mouse). In biological materials, the phenomenon is known as biospeckle.

In a static environment, changes in speckle can also be used as a sensitive probe of the light source. This can be used in a wavemeter configuration, with a resolution around 1 attometre, (equivalent to 1 part in 10^{12} of the wavelength, equivalent to measuring the length of a football field at the resolution of a single atom) and can also stabilise the wavelength of lasers or measure polarization.

The disordered pattern produced by speckle has been used in quantum simulations with cold atoms. The randomly-distributed regions of bright and dark light act as an analog of disorder in solid-state systems, and are used to investigate localization phenomena.

In fluorescence microscopy, a sub-diffraction-limited resolution can be obtained in 2D from saturable/photoconvertible pattern illumination techniques like stimulated emission depletion (STED) microscopy, ground state depletion (GSD) microscopy, and reversible saturable optical fluorescence transitions (RESOLFT). Adapting speckle patterns for use in these applications enables parallel 3D super-resolution imaging.

== Mitigation ==
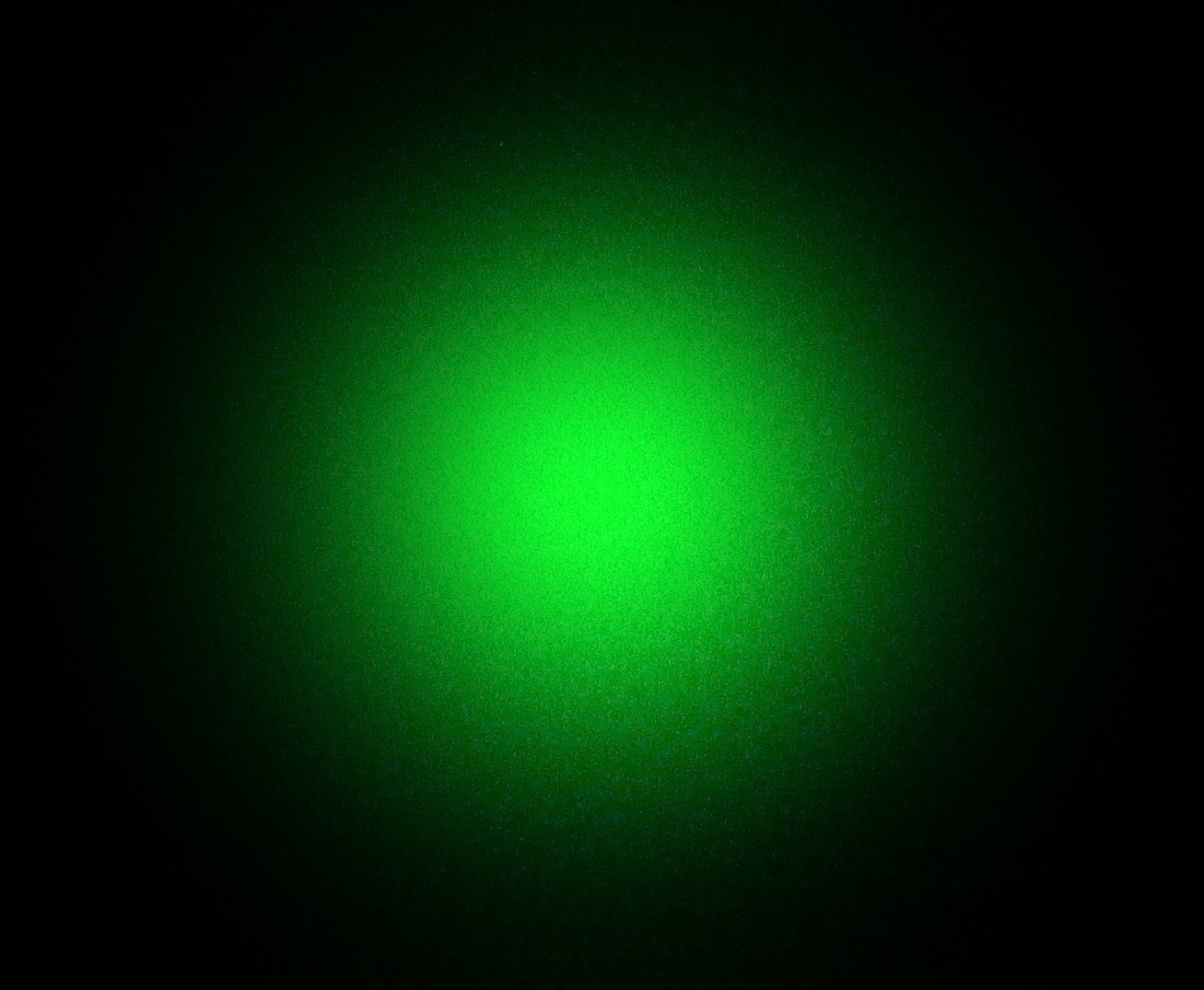
A green laser pointer. Reduction of the speckle was necessary to photograph the laser's Gaussian profile, accomplished by removing all lenses and projecting it onto an opaque liquid (milk) being the only surface flat and smooth enough.

Speckle is considered to be a problem in laser based display systems like the Laser TV. Speckle is usually quantified by the speckle contrast. Speckle contrast reduction is essentially the creation of many independent speckle patterns, so that they average out on the retina/detector. This can be achieved by,

- Angle diversity: illumination from different angles
- Polarization diversity: use of different polarization states
- Wavelength diversity: use of laser sources which differ in wavelength by a small amount

Rotating diffusers—which destroys the spatial coherence of the laser light—can also be used to reduce the speckle. Moving/vibrating screens or fibers may also be solutions. The Mitsubishi Laser TV appears to use such a screen which requires special care according to their product manual. A more detailed discussion on laser speckle reduction can be found here.

Synthetic array heterodyne detection was developed to reduce speckle noise in coherent optical imaging and coherent differential absorption LIDAR.

=== Signal processing methods ===
In scientific applications, a spatial filter can be used to reduce speckle.

Several different methods are used to eliminate speckle, based upon different mathematical models of the phenomenon. One method, for example, employs multiple-look processing (a.k.a. multi-look processing), averaging out the speckle by taking several "looks" at a target in a single radar sweep. The average is the incoherent average of the looks.

A second method involves using adaptive and non-adaptive filters on the signal processing (where adaptive filters adapt their weightings across the image to the speckle level, and non-adaptive filters apply the same weightings uniformly across the entire image). Such filtering also eliminates actual image information as well, in particular high-frequency information, and the applicability of filtering and the choice of filter type involves tradeoffs. Adaptive speckle filtering is better at preserving edges and detail in high-texture areas (such as forests or urban areas). Non-adaptive filtering is simpler to implement, and requires less computational power, however.

There are two forms of non-adaptive speckle filtering: one based on the mean and one based upon the median (within a given rectangular area of pixels in the image). The latter is better at preserving edges whilst eliminating spikes, than the former is. There are many forms of adaptive speckle filtering, including the Lee filter, the Frost filter, and the refined gamma maximum-A-posteriori (RGMAP) filter. They all rely upon three fundamental assumptions in their mathematical models, however:

- Speckle in SAR is a multiplicative, i.e. it is in direct proportion to the local grey level in any area.
- The signal and the speckle are statistically independent of each other.
- The sample mean and variance of a single pixel are equal to the mean and variance of the local area that is centred on that pixel.

The Lee filter converts the multiplicative model into an additive one, thereby reducing the problem of dealing with speckle to a known tractable case.

=== Wavelet analysis ===
Recently, the use of wavelet transform has led to significant advances in image analysis. The main reason for the use of multiscale processing is the fact that many natural signals, when decomposed into wavelet bases are significantly simplified and can be modeled by known distributions. Besides, wavelet decomposition is able to separate signals at different scales and orientations. Therefore, the original signal at any scale and direction can be recovered and useful details are not lost.

The first multiscale speckle reduction methods were based on the thresholding of detail subband coefficients. Wavelet thresholding methods have some drawbacks: (i) the choice of threshold is made in an ad hoc manner, supposing that wanted and unwanted components of the signal obey their known distributions, irrespective of their scale and orientations; and (ii) the thresholding procedure generally results in some artifacts in the denoised image. To address these disadvantages, non-linear estimators, based on Bayes' theory were developed.

== Analogies ==
Speckle patterns can also be observed over time instead of space. This is the case of phase sensitive optical time-domain reflectometry, where multiple reflections of a coherent pulse generated at different instants interfere to produce a pseudorandom time-domain signal.

== Optical vortices in speckle patterns ==
Speckle interference pattern may be decomposed in the sum of plane waves. There exist a set of points where amplitude of electromagnetic field is exactly zero. Researchers had recognized these points as dislocations of wave trains. We know these phase dislocations of electromagnetic fields as optical vortices. The term optical vortex is also applied to a deliberately structured vortex beam that carries a helical phase front along its axis, endowing it with orbital angular momentum.

There is a circular energy flow around each vortex core. Thus each vortex in the speckle pattern carries optical angular momentum. The angular momentum density is given by:

$$\begin{align}
\vec \mathbf{L} \left(\vec \mathbf{r}, t\right) &= \vec \mathbf{r} \times \vec  \mathbf{S} \left(\vec \mathbf{r}, t\right) \\
\vec \mathbf{S} \left(\vec \mathbf{r}, t\right) &= \epsilon_0 c^2 \vec  \mathbf{E} \left(\vec \mathbf{r}, t\right) \times \vec  \mathbf{B} \left(\vec \mathbf{r}, t\right).
\end{align}$$

Typically vortices appear in speckle pattern in pairs. These vortex - antivortex pairs are placed randomly in space. One may show that electromagnetic angular momentum of each vortex pair is close to zero. Speckle patterns can also arise when a deliberately structured vortex beam illuminates a rough surface. If the surface is strongly rough, the incident helical wavefront collapses into a speckle field filled with numerous new vortex–antivortex pairs, among which the original on‑axis phase singularity is lost. In such a reflection, the topological charge of the vortex beam changes sign, as it would for any mirror. In phase conjugating mirrors based on stimulated Brillouin scattering optical vortices excite acoustical vortices.

Apart from formal decomposition in Fourier series the speckle pattern may be composed for plane waves emitted by tilted regions of the phase plate. This approach significantly simplifies numerical modelling. 3D numerical emulation demonstrates the intertwining of vortices which leads to formation of ropes in optical speckle.

== See also ==
- Diffusing-wave spectroscopy
- Gaussian noise
- Laser speckle contrast imaging
- Salt and pepper noise
