= Holographic interferometry =

Measuring technique

Holographic interferometry (HI) is a technique that enables the measurement of static and dynamic displacements of objects with optically rough surfaces at optical interferometric precision (i.e., to fractions of a wavelength of light). These measurements can be applied to stress, strain, and vibration analysis, as well as to non-destructive testing and radiation dosimetry. It can also be used to detect optical path length variations in transparent media, which enables, for example, fluid flow to be visualized and analyzed. It can also be used to generate contours representing the form of the surface.

Holography is the two-step process of recording a diffracted light field scattered from an object, and performing image rendering. This process can be achieved with traditional photographic plates or with a digital sensor array, in digital holography. If the recorded field is superimposed on the "live field" scattered from the object, the two fields will be identical. If, however, a small deformation is applied to the object, the relative phases of the two light fields will alter, and it is possible to observe interference. This technique is known as live holographic interferometry.

It is also possible to obtain fringes by making two recordings of the light field scattered from the object on the same recording medium. The reconstructed light fields may then interfere to give fringes which map out the displacement of the surface. This is known as "frozen fringe" holography.

The form of the fringe pattern is related to the changes in surface position or air compaction.

Many methods of analyzing such patterns have been developed in recent years.

== Discovery ==
Several research groups published papers in 1965 describing holographic interferometry. While the first observations of phenomena that could be ascribed to holographic interferometry were made by Juris Upatnieks in 1963 the essential feature of the process was not understood until the work of Powell and Stetson. Their experiments were conducted over the period of October to December 1964, and they began with an investigation of the periodic coherence length of the HeNe laser being used. The compact laser beam was used to illuminate a spot on a small object that was placed between two mirrors such that its image could be observed looking over one mirror into the tunnel of multiple reflections between the mirrors. Each image was 10 cm greater in path length than the one before it. Because these lasers had about three longitudinal modes, their coherence length was periodic, as described by the manufacturer, Spectra Physics in cooperation with the Perkin Elmer Corporation. This was demonstrated by recording a hologram of the view over one of the mirrors.

In one of the holograms, however, a dark band was observed in the closest image to the hologram, and it was observed to shift position with perspective. This band was not observable in the original laser beam and had to be something created by the holographic process. The confocal laser cavity consisted of a spherical mirror at the output end with a flat mirror at the center of curvature at the other end. Adjustment of the longitudinal spacing controlled the number of off-axis modes of oscillation, and it was observed that the laser was oscillating in more than one axis mode. The multiple laser modes were incoherent and did not interfere in the observable laser beam, so why did they interfere in the hologram reconstruction? Stetson put forth the idea that each mode existed in both the object and in the reference beam, and each pair recorded a separate hologram in the photographic plate. When these were reconstructed, both recordings reconstructed simultaneously from the same laser beam and the fields were then mutually coherent. Powell objected to this idea, because it implied that the hologram had the power to coherently reconstruct fields that were incoherent during its recording.

The resulting arguments gave rise to a set of experiments that were later published in 1966. These consisted of: (1) Recording the reflection of a concentrated laser beam while capturing the entire reference beam on the hologram and adjusting the laser for combinations of off-axis modes. (2) Recording double-exposure holograms of an object where the object, the reference beam mirror, and the hologram itself were rotated slightly between exposures. (3) Recording holograms of the bottom of a 35 mm film can while it was vibrating. Later, in April 1965, Stetson and Powell obtained real-time interference patterns between a real object and its holographic reconstruction.

== Applications ==
=== Laser vibrometry ===
Since its introduction, vibrometry by holographic interferometry has become commonplace. Powell and Stetson have shown that the fringes of the time-averaged hologram of a vibrating object correspond to the zeros of the Bessel function $J_0(\phi)$, where $\phi(x,y)$ is the modulation depth of the phase modulation of the optical field at $x, y$ on the object. With this method, the local vibration amplitude can be assessed by fringe counting. In the work reported by Aleksoff, the reference beam was shifted in frequency to select one sideband of order $n$. In that case, the fringes for sideband $n$ correspond to the zeros of the Bessel function $J_n(\phi)$. By sequential imaging of frequency sidebands, the issue of fringe counting has been alleviated. The side band order is a marker of the local amplitude of sinusoidal out-of-plane motion. Multiplexed measurements of optical sidebands enable quantitative measurements of out-of-plane vibration amplitudes much smaller than the optical wavelength.

=== Laser Doppler imaging ===
In off-axis configuration, with a slow camera and a laser diode, holographic interferometry is sensitive enough to enable wide-field, laser Doppler imaging of optical fluctuations in amplitude and phase, either with a slow or a fast camera. A slow (e.g. video rate) camera will record time-averaged holographic interferograms which will result in lowpass filtering of the optical fluctuation signal. By shifting the frequency of the reference beam, the lowpass filter becomes a bandpass filter centered at the detuning frequency, and selective narrowband detection and imaging can be performed. This method permits microvascular blood flow imaging, and wide-field measurement of photoplethysmograms by detection of out-of-plane tissue motion. The wide temporal bandwidth of a high throughput camera can enable wideband detection and analysis of optical fluctuations. It can be used for pulsatile blood flow imaging.

== See also ==
- Electronic speckle pattern interferometry
- Holography
- Interferometry
