= Megalopapilla =

Enlarged optic nerve head

- Specialty: Ophthalmology
- Types: 2 types
- Differential diagnosis: Normal tension glaucoma

Megalopapilla is a non-progressive human eye condition in which the optic nerve head (optic disc) has an enlarged diameter, exceeding 2.1 mm with no other morphological abnormalities.

== Types ==
There are two types of megalopapilla. Type 1, which is the most common, is bilateral with a normal configuration of the optic cup. Type 2 is unilateral with a superiorly displaced cup that eliminates the adjacent neuro-retinal rim.

== Presentation ==
In megalopapilla the optic disc diameter exceeds 2.1 mm (or surface area more than 2.5 mm^{2}) with an increased cup-to-disc ratio. Although the optic disc is looks abnormal, the disc colour, sharpness of disc margin, rim volume, configuration of blood vessels and intraocular pressure will be normal. Visual field is normal except for an enlarged blind spot. Visual acuity may be normal, or occasionally reduced.

== Diagnosis ==
Large disc size can be seen in fundus examination by ophthalmoscopy. Since OCT is not influenced by disc size, it can be used in differentiating normal and glaucomatous eyes with large discs.

=== Differential diagnosis ===
Since the clinical appearance of megalopapilla resembles that of glaucomatous optic disc, it should be differentiated from Normal tension glaucoma and other pseudo-glaucomatous diseases. Other conditions that resembles megalopapilla includes coloboma of optic disc and orbital optic disc glioma.

== History ==
Bock and Franceschetti were the first to use the term megalopapilla to describe larger-than-normal optic disks.
