= Optic nerve hypoplasia =

Underdevelopment of the optic nerve

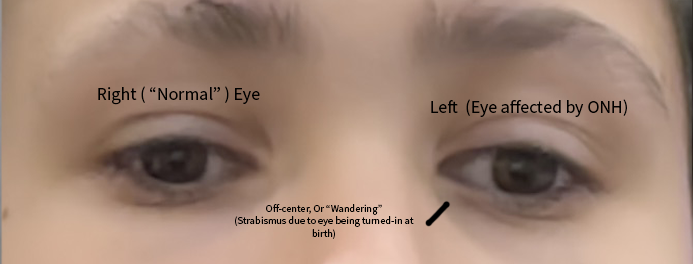
- Left eye affected by ONH, originally turned-in at birth, corrected by surgery under 12 months of age. Patient has 13% vision in eye [Enough to be considered legally blind by Australian law, patient's country of birth/origin]
- Specialty: Optometry, Medical genetics
- Symptoms: Strabismus, Partial or complete blindness in affected eye(s), amblyopia, Unintentional eye movement
- Complications: Vision issues or Comeplete/partial blindness
- Treatment: Eye patch to 'strengthen' affected eye

Optic nerve hypoplasia (ONH) is a medical condition arising from the underdevelopment (hypoplasia) of the optic nerve(s). This condition is the most common congenital optic nerve anomaly. The optic disc appears abnormally small because not all the optic nerve axons have developed properly. It is often associated with endocrinopathies (hormone deficiencies), developmental delay, and brain malformations. The optic nerve, responsible for transmitting visual signals from the retina to the brain, has approximately 1.2 million nerve fibers in the average person. In those diagnosed with ONH, however, there are noticeably fewer nerves.

== Symptoms and signs ==
ONH may be found in isolation or in conjunction with myriad functional and anatomic abnormalities of the central nervous system. Nearly 80% of those affected with ONH will experience hypothalamic dysfunction and/or impaired development of the brain, regardless of MRI findings or severity of ONH.

=== Vision ===
ONH can be unilateral (in one eye) or bilateral (in both eyes), though it presents most often bilaterally (80%). Unilateral cases tend to have better vision and are typically diagnosed at a later age than bilateral cases. Visual acuity can range from no light perception to near-normal vision.

Children diagnosed with ONH generally present with vision problems, including nystagmus (involuntary movement of the eyes), which tends to develop at 1 to 3 months and/or strabismus (inability to align both eyes simultaneously), which manifests during the first year of life.

Most children affected experience improvement in vision during the first few years of life, though the reason for this occurrence is unknown. There have been no reported cases of decline in vision due to ONH.

=== Neuroradiographic abnormalities ===
Estimates of cerebral malformations vary from 39% to 90% of children with ONH. Abnormalities evident via neuroradiography can include agenesis (absence) or hypoplasia of the corpus callosum, absence or incomplete development of the septum pellucidum, malformations of the pituitary gland, schizencephaly, cortical heterotopia, white matter hypoplasia, pachygyria, and holoprosencephaly. Hypoplasia of the corpus callosum, often in conjunction with other major malformations, is significantly associated with poor and delayed developmental outcomes.

ONH is often referred to as septo-optic dysplasia, a term that refers to agenesis of the septum pellucidum. It is clear that the absence of the septum pellucidum does not correlate with the associated symptoms of ONH.

=== Hypothalamic dysfunction ===
Dysfunction of the hypothalamus results in loss of regulation over behavior and function of the pituitary gland (master gland). Hypopituitarism is present in 75% to 80% of patients with ONH. The anterior pituitary gland contributes to growth, metabolism, and sexual development. The most common pituitary endocrinopathies are growth hormone (GH) deficiency (70%), hypothyroidism (43%), adrenal insufficiency (27%), and diabetes insipidus (5%).

Absence of GH may often be indicated by short stature, although this is not always the case. Other indicators of GH deficiency may include hypoglycemic events (including seizures), prolonged jaundice, micropenis in boys, and delayed dentition. Testing for GH may involve blood tests (IGF-1 and IGFBP-3), a growth hormone stimulation test, or a bone age x-ray of the hand or wrist (or body for children younger than 2 years).

A poorly functioning pituitary gland may also cause a lack of thyroid hormone, leading to central hypothyroidism. Thyroid hormone is critical for growth and brain development, especially during the first few weeks to months of life. Children with untreated hypothyroidism are at high risk of intellectual disability; thus, early detection is crucial. Central hypothyroidism can be diagnosed by a low or normal thyroid-stimulating hormone (TSH) in the presence of a low level of free T4. Free T-4 should be checked annually for at least four years.

Cortisol is made in times of stress. Approximately one-quarter of patients with ONH have adrenal insufficiency, meaning they do not produce enough cortisol daily or in stressful situations.

Imbalances in sex hormones may result in a delay in sexual development (puberty) or precocious puberty. Sex hormones may be tested from birth to 6 months of age (during mini-puberty).

Hyperprolactinemia (an excess of prolactin) often occurs in conjunction with ONH and indicates either dysfunction of the hypothalamus or a disconnect between the hypothalamus and pituitary gland. Hyperprolactinemia often correlates with the development of obesity in children with ONH.

The posterior pituitary gland produces anti-diuretic hormone (ADH), which controls the outflow of water from the body in urine. ADH deficiency, also known as diabetes insipidus (DI), results in dehydration and high sodium levels in the body from excessive urination. Testing for DI involves blood and urine testing, including water deprivation tests, to determine ADH creation levels by the body. DI may be treated with a medication called desmopressin acetate (DDAVP).

Oxytocin is also produced in the posterior pituitary gland. Though best known for its role in childbirth and lactation, oxytocin has also been found to have a role in human bonding, increased trust, and decreased fear.

Hypothalamic dysfunction may also result in problems with feeding, sleep, and body temperature regulation. Feeding behaviors in children with ONH often include hyperphagia (overeating), resulting in obesity, or hypophagia (reduced food intake) with or without weight loss. Children also frequently experience aversion to specific textures of food. Disturbance of circadian sleep rhythm, resulting in abnormal sleep-wake cycles, is noted in one-third of children with ONH. This disturbance could result in behavioral problems and disruption of family life.

=== Development ===
More than 70% of children with ONH experience developmental delay, ranging from isolated focal defects to delay in all areas of development (global delay). Motor delay is most common (75%), and communication delay is least common (44%). Predictors of significantly delayed development include hypoplasia or agenesis of the corpus callosum and hypothyroidism. The absence of the septum pellucidum does not predict developmental delay. Delays may occur in unilateral (39%) and bilateral (78%) cases.

== Cause ==
=== Genetic risks ===
Mutations of genes involved in transcription regulation, chromatin remodelling, α-dystroglycan glycosylation, cytoskeleton and scaffolding protein, RNA splicing, and the MAP kinase signalling pathway are currently known to cause ONH. Many transcription factors for eye development are also involved in the morphogenesis of the forebrain, which may explain why ONH is commonly a part of a syndrome involving brain malformations.

ONH impacts all ethnic groups, although in the United States, the occurrence is lower in persons of Asian descent. To date, there have been few reports of ONH occurrence in Asian countries, although it is uncertain why this is so.

=== Gestational and exposure history ===
Although many perinatal and prenatal risk factors for ONH have been suggested, the predominant, enduring, most frequent risk factors are young maternal age and primiparity (the affected child being the first child born to the mother). Increased frequency of delivery by caesarean section and fetal/neonatal complications, preterm labor, gestational vaginal bleeding, low maternal weight gain, and weight loss during pregnancy are also associated with ONH.

== Diagnosis ==
ONH is diagnosed by ophthalmoscopic examination. Patients with ONH exhibit an optic nerve that appears smaller than normal and different from small optic nerves caused by other eye conditions, such as optic (nerve) atrophy.

DM:DD ratio has proven to be a clinically useful measurement to help diagnose optic nerve hypoplasia. Where "DM" represents the distance from Disk to Macula, and "DD" represents Disc Diameter.

The mean disc diameter (DD) is (Vertical diameter of Disc+Horizontal diameter of Disc) divided by 2. The distance between the center of the disc and the macula is DM.

Interpretation: When the ratio of DM to DD is greater than 3, ONH is suspected, and when it is greater than 4, Optic Nerve Hypoplasia is definite.

A segmental form, superior segmental optic nerve hypoplasia (SSONH), primarily affects the superior portion of the optic disc and is often associated with an inferior visual-field defect. The condition is generally non-progressive and has a recognized association with maternal diabetes.

== Treatment ==
There is no cure for ONH; however, many therapeutic interventions exist for the care of its symptoms. These may include hormone therapy for hypopituitarism, occupational, physical, and/or speech therapy for other issues, and services of a teacher for students with blindness/visual impairment. Special attention should be paid to the early development of oral motor skills and acclimation to textured foods for children with texture aversion or otherwise eating resistant.

Sleep dysfunction can be ameliorated using melatonin in the evening to adjust a child's circadian clock.

Treatment for strabismus may include patching of the better eye, which may result in improved vision in the worse eye; however, this should be reserved for cases where the potential for vision improvement in both eyes is felt to be good. Surgery to align the eyes can be performed once children with strabismus develop equal visual acuity in both eyes, most often after age three. Generally, surgery results in improved appearance only and not in improved visual function.

== Prognosis ==
The visual prognosis in optic nerve hypoplasia is quite variable. Optic nerve hypoplasia may occasionally be compatible with near-normal vision; in other cases, one or both eyes may be functionally or legally blind. Although most patients with only optic nerve involvement lead normally productive lives, those with accompanying endocrine dysfunction or other midline cerebral abnormalities are more at risk for ongoing intellectual and other disabilities.

== Epidemiology ==
Optic nerve hypoplasia (ONH) is a congenital condition in which the optic nerve is underdeveloped (small). Many times, de Morsier's Syndrome or septo-optic dysplasia (SOD) is associated with ONH, however, it is possible to have ONH without any additional issues like SOD. SOD is a condition that can involve multiple problems in the midline structures of the brain, stemming from miswiring of the brain and central nervous system. Besides having small optic nerves, people with ONH can have agenesis of the corpus callosum, absence of the septum pellucidum, maldevelopment of the anterior and posterior pituitary gland, and anomalies of the hypothalamus. Because of this, all children with ONH are at risk for developmental delays and hormonal deficiencies, regardless of the severity of ONH or whether abnormalities are visible by MRI.

ONH is the leading cause of permanent legal blindness in children in the Western world. The incidence of ONH is increasing, although it is difficult to estimate the true prevalence. Between 1980 and 1999, the occurrences of ONH in Sweden increased fourfold to 7.2 per 100,000, while all other causes of childhood blindness had declined. In 1997, ONH overtook retinopathy of prematurity as the single leading cause of infant blindness in Sweden, with 6.3 in every 100,000 births diagnosed with ONH. England's most recent prevalence report in 2006 is 10.9 per 100,000.
