= Normal tension glaucoma =

Human disease

Normal tension glaucoma (NTG) is an eye disease, a neuropathy of the optic nerve, that shows all the characteristics of primary open angle glaucoma except one: the elevated intraocular pressure (IOP) - the classic hallmark of glaucoma - is missing. Normal tension glaucoma is in many cases closely associated with general issues of blood circulation and of organ perfusion like arterial hypotension, metabolic syndrome, and Flammer syndrome.

== Clinical relevance ==
Over many years, glaucoma has been defined by an intraocular pressure of more than 20 mm Hg. Incompatible with this (now obsolete) definition of glaucoma was the ever larger number of cases that have been reported in medical literature in the 1980s and 1990s who had the typical signs of glaucomatous damage, like optic nerve head excavation and thinning of the retinal nerve fiber layer, while these patients had an IOP that would generally have been regarded as "normal". It is now widely estimated that a larger percentage of patients with primary open-angle glaucoma (POAG) are suffering from normal tension glaucoma. Among Americans of Japanese descent, for instance, the prevalence of NTG is about four times as high as the prevalence of the "classical glaucoma" with an IOP of 22 mm Hg and higher. The pillar of the current understanding of normal tension glaucoma is a reduced IOP tolerance of the retinal ganglion cells and the cells in the optic nerve head - an IOP of, for example, 17 or 19 mm Hg that would not affect a healthy eye leads to damage in the eye of an NTG patient.

== Risk factors ==
In many patients, normal tension glaucoma is common in individuals with a generalized reduced perfusion of organs and certain body tissues. A low blood pressure - whether consistently low or with sudden pressure drops - is associated with NTG as are conditions like Flammer syndrome and obstructive sleep apnea. Flammer syndrome has been attributed to increase the likelihood of ganglion cell damage in normal tension glaucoma patients with disc hemorrhages as a characteristic clinical sign. Besides race (Japanese) and low blood pressure, the female gender is also a risk factor.

== Diagnosis ==
While tonometry, the measuring of IOP and thus a classical instrument in the diagnosis of glaucoma, is not helpful, ophthalmoscopy leads to the diagnosis by showing typical glaucomatous damage, primarily at the optic nerve head, in the absence of elevated IOP. While the excavation of the optic nerve head and the thinning of its rim appear in all kinds of glaucoma (with high tension and with normal tension, in Primary open angle glaucoma (POAG) and in secondary glaucoma), small hemorrhages close to the optic disc have been identified as a characteristic clinical sign of normal tension glaucoma. Visual field is very important to detect NTG. It shows a defect that typically appears deeper, steeper and closer to fixation comparing to patients with POAG. Since NTG is closely linked to vascular irregularities, a medical check-up by a general practitioner or a specialist in internal medicine is widely recommended in cases of newly diagnosed normal tension glaucoma. An examination that is considered to be of particular importance is a 24-hour monitoring of the blood pressure. NTG patients tend to suffer "dips", sudden and unnoticed drops in blood pressure during sleep.

== Treatment ==
Without treatment, NTG leads to progressive visual field loss and in the last consequence to blindness. The mainstay of conventional glaucoma therapy, reducing IOP by pressure-lowering eye drops or by surgery, is applied in cases of NTG as well. The rationale: the lower the IOP, the less the risk of ganglion cell loss and thus in the long run of visual function. The appearance of disc hemorrhages is always a warning sign that therapeutic approaches are not successful - the small bleedings, usually described as flame-shaped, almost always indicate a progression of the disease. Besides this classical glaucoma therapy, the vascular component that exists in the majority of NTG patients has to be managed as well. Dips in blood pressure or a generally low blood pressure have to be prevented - which is a rather uncommon approach in modern medicine where high blood pressure is always seen as an immense clinical challenge, affecting large segments of the population. In patients with systemic hypertension under therapy, the blood pressure should not be lowered too rigorously. NTG might be the only severe (= sight-threatening) disease caused in numerous cases by a too low blood pressure. Both magnesium and low dose calcium channel blockers have been employed in the treatment of some NTG patients. There are therapeutic approaches to underlying conditions like Flammer syndrome. A change in nutrition like the intake of sodium-rich foods has been tried as has the oral administration of low-dosed steroids. Lifestyle interventions are recommended in patients with Flammer syndrome like avoidance of fasting and certain stimuli like a cold environment and stress.
