= Optic pit =

- Optic disc(# 18)

Optic pit, optic nerve pit, or optic disc pit (ODP) is rare a congenital excavation (or regional depression) of the optic disc (also optic nerve head), resulting from a malformation during development of the eye. The incidence of ODP is 1 in 10,000 people with no predilection for either gender. There is currently no known risk factors for their development. Optic pits are important because they are associated with posterior vitreous detachments (PVD) and even serous retinal detachments.

== Signs and symptoms ==
Many times, an optic pit is asymptomatic and is just an incidental finding on examination of the eye by a physician. However, some patients may present with the symptoms of a posterior vitreous detachment or serous retinal detachment. This is because optic pits are associated with these disorders and are even speculated to be the actual cause of these disorders when they arise in patients with optic pits (see "Associated Retinal Changes" below for a more in-depth discussion on this theory). The most common visual field defects include an enlarged blind spot and a scotoma. Visual acuity is typically not affected by the pit but may get worse if serous detachment of the macula occurs. Metamorphopsia (distorted vision) may then result.

Optic pits were first described in 1882 as dark gray depressions in the optic disc. They may, however, appear white or yellowish instead. They can also range greatly in size (e.g. some can be minuscule while others may be large enough as to occupy most of optic disc surface). Optic pits are associated with other abnormalities of the optic nerve including large optic nerve size, large inferior colobomas of the optic disc, and colobomas of the retina. The optic disc originates from the optic cup when the optic vesicle invaginates and forms an embryonic fissure (or groove). Optic pits may develop due to failure of the superior end of the embryonic fissure to close completely.

== Risk factors ==
No particular risk factors have been conclusively identified; however, there have been a few reports that demonstrate an autosomal dominant pattern of inheritance in some families. Therefore, a family history of optic pits may be a possible risk factor.

=== Associated retinal changes ===
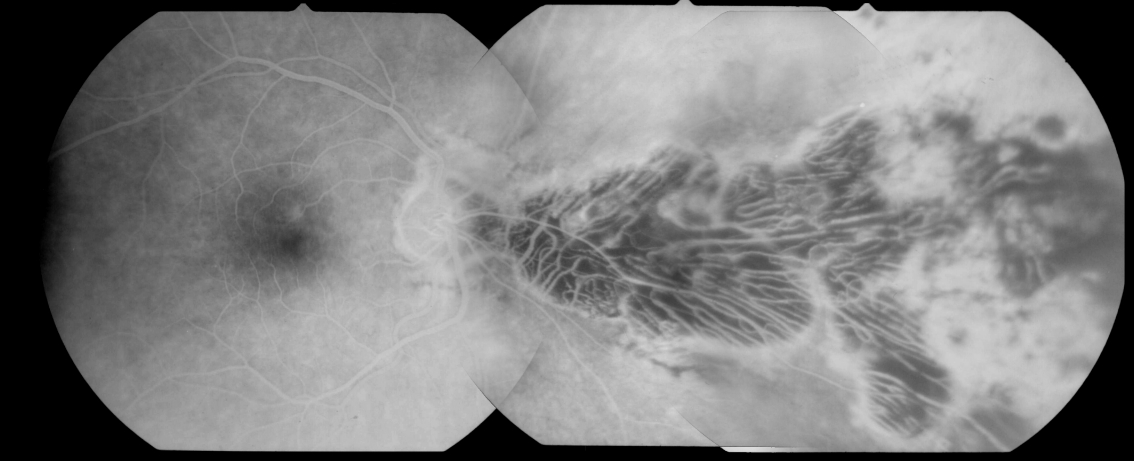
Large optic pit (fluorescein angiography)

Optic pits have been associated with serous retinal detachments in up to as many as 50% of all cases. These detachments may occur at any age but most frequently present in early adulthood. The most popular theory behind this association is a separation of the layers of the retina, known as retinoschisis, due to fluid (the vitreous humour) entering the optic pit and traveling between the inner and outer layers of the retina. The outer layer may then subsequently detach. Evidence of retinoschisis has been demonstrated using OCT.

Centrally located optic pits are less likely to cause changes in the retina. However, if located more peripherally in the optic disc, then it is more likely to cause a serous retinal detachment. Furthermore, if the optic pit is located temporally (which the majority are), then it is more likely to cause detachment of the macula because of the macula's proximity to the temporal side of the optic disc. If serous macular detachment occurs, a patient's visual acuity may become as poor as 20/200 or worse.

Treatment for optic pit-associated macular detachment involves photocoagulation of the retina by use of an ion laser (either krypton or argon). This procedure works by burning one or more rows in between the optic disc and areas of serous retinal detachment. In most cases, macular reattachment results and visual acuity can be restored to about 20/80. This procedure may also be utilized prior to macular detachment in order to help prevent the future development of macular detachment. Other treatments for optic pit-associated macular detachment include macular buckling, gas tamponade, or vitrectomy. Some experts feel that the best results can be attained when the use of any of the above-mentioned modalities (laser photocoagulation, macular buckling, gas tamponade, and vitrectomy) are used in combination.

== Diagnosis ==
Optic pits should be diagnosed by an eye care professional who can perform a thorough exam of the back of the eye using an ophthalmoscope. More recently, the development of a special technology called optical coherence tomography (OCT) has allowed better visualization of the retinal layers. It has been used to demonstrate a marked reduction in the thickness of the retinal nerve fiber layer in the quadrant corresponding to the optic pit. This is not yet in standard use for diagnosis of an optic pit, but may be helpful in supporting a diagnosis.

== Treatment ==
Optic pits themselves do not need to be treated. However, patients should follow up with their eye care professional annually or even sooner if the patient notices any visual loss whatsoever. Treatment of PVD or serous retinal detachment will be necessary if either develops in a patient with an optic pit. Optic disc maculopathy can be treated with vitrectomy (removal of the vitreous in the eye).

== Occurrence ==
Optic pits occur equally between men and women. They are seen in roughly 1 in 10,000 eyes, and approximately 85% of optic pits are found to be unilateral (i.e. in only one eye of any affected individual). About 70% are found on the temporal side (or lateral one-half) of the optic disc. Another 20% are found centrally, while the remaining pits are located either superiorly (in the upper one-half), inferiorly (in the lower one-half), or nasally (in the medial one-half towards the nose).
