= Flammer syndrome =

Syndrome of vascular dysregulation

- Specialty: Angiology

Flammer syndrome is a described clinical entity comprising a complex of clinical features caused mainly by dysregulation of the blood supply. It was previously known as vascular dysregulation. It can manifest in many symptoms, such as cold hands and feet, and is often associated with low blood pressure. In certain cases it is associated with or predisposes to the development of diseases such as a normal tension glaucoma. Flammer syndrome is named after the Swiss ophthalmologist Josef Flammer.

== Signs and symptoms ==
Most of the symptoms of Flammer syndrome result from an impaired regulation of the blood supply. How these symptoms affect the patient depends on to which organs or body parts blood supply is inhibited. Typical symptoms of Flammer syndrome are cold hands or feet, low blood pressure, occasional white and red patches on the face or neck, and migraine-like pain or a feeling of pressure behind the upper eyelid. In addition, there are symptoms not directly resulting from dysregulations of the blood supply, such as a prolonged time needed to fall asleep, a reduced feeling of thirst, and high sensitivity not only to cold but also to odors, vibrations, psychological stress, or certain medications (e.g., calcium antagonists, beta blockers). Pain and muscle spasms are common.

In many people with glaucoma, the cause of the disease is perfusion issues of the optic nerve and retina, while intraocular pressure is normal. Many patients with normal tension glaucoma have a basic constitution, which corresponds to the Flammer syndrome. Some of its features were formerly summarized under the term "primary vascular dysregulation syndrome".

Signs of Flammer syndrome include:

- cold hands or feet, or both
- arterial hypotension
- lower body mass index
- decreased feeling of thirst
- prolongation of time to fall asleep
- increased sensitivity to pain and odors
- sensitivity to certain drugs
- migraine
- tinnitus
- reversible patchy white or red discoloration of the skin
- excessive response to mental or physical stimuli such as stress or cold

The disease is more prevalent in the following groups:

- in women compared to men
- in people with lower blood pressure
- in Asians compared with Caucasians
- in academics compared with blue collar-workers

People with Flammer syndrome sleep poorly and have a decreased sensation of thirst.

== Diagnosis ==
The diagnosis of Flammer syndrome is primarily based on the patient's history with its typical features as well as the findings of nail fold capillaroscopy. This test shows an excessive constriction (narrowing) in the smallest blood vessels (capillaries) of the fingers in response to being exposed to cold. Patients with vasospastic symptoms characteristic of Flammer syndrome have shown a unique gene expression when their lymphocytes underwent gene expression profiling.

=== Clinical significance ===
Having Flammer syndrome does not necessarily mean that an individual is sick. Most of those affected are and remain healthy. Certain diseases such as arteriosclerosis and its consequences are probably even rarer. Best known is the higher risk of normal tension glaucoma, a disease with an impaired regulation of blood flow in a large number of patients. If glaucomatous damage occurs despite normal eye pressure or if glaucomatous damage is progressive despite normalized intraocular pressure, frequently Flammer syndrome is the cause. In these eyes, an elevated pressure in the retinal veins has been observed.

Glaucoma patients with Flammer syndrome show some specific clinical signs like increased frequency of optic disc haemorrhages, activated retinal astrocytes, elevated retinal venous pressure, optic nerve compartmentalization, and fluctuating diffuse visual field defects. The association of normal tension glaucoma with the syndrome has recently been confirmed by a group of Chinese researchers. In a 2016 review on the risk factors for normal tension glaucoma by ophthalmologists from Asia (where this form of glaucoma is much more prevalent than in Europe or North America), Flammer syndrome has been attributed to increase the likelihood of ganglion cell damage in these patients, with disc hemorrhages as a characteristic clinical sign. Migraine attacks, a common feature of Flammer syndrome, have been described as a risk factor for glaucoma progression, in open-angle glaucoma as well as in normal tension glaucoma. Flammer syndrome may also predispose to other eye diseases such as vascular occlusion (especially retinal vein occlusion) in relatively young people or central serous retinopathy. Muscle spasms and tension are common among individuals with Flammer syndrome. Tinnitus and sometimes even acute hearing loss can occur. There is currently insufficient data available on cases where Flammer syndrome is suspected like in the sudden, unexpected deaths of young athletes. People with retinitis pigmentosa seem to have Flammer syndrome quite frequently, and possible associations with the vascular factor endothelin-1 are under investigation.

== Management ==
Flammer syndrome requires no therapy as long as the individual does not experience the symptoms or pathological sequelae occur. The treatment is based on three pillars: lifestyle interventions, diet, and medication. A healthy lifestyle should include regular sleep, weight stabilization (in the sense of not being underweight), avoiding periods of fasting, and avoidance of known trigger factors such as cold. Regular physical exercise is beneficial, while extreme sports might be detrimental. Nutrition should contain many antioxidants, such as those found in green tea, black filter coffee, red wine, blueberries, and fruits. Omega-3 fatty acids, especially in the form of fish, improve the regulation of blood flow, as well as ginkgo. If blood pressure is very low, salt intake should be increased. Drugs that can lead to vasoconstriction should be avoided. If blood pressure is too low, sleeping pills should be taken cautiously. Calcium antagonists like magnesium may help against the vascular dysregulation. With lifestyle interventions, attacks—particularly pronounced symptoms such as massive cold extremities, tinnitus, or migraine-like episodes—can be avoided or reduced. Stabilizing weight (i.e. not being underweight) and the avoidance of periods of fasting are important.

Medical treatment is necessary when normal tension glaucoma is present. In these cases, in addition to the ophthalmologic treatment of glaucoma, the patient's usually low blood pressure should be addressed. With dietary measures such as salt intake and sometimes with low-dose steroids, a drop in blood pressure, especially during sleep, can often be prevented. These nightly "dips" of blood pressure in normal tension glaucoma patients with Flammer syndrome can significantly damage the sensory cells of the retina.

== History ==
For over 100 years vasospasms have been known, particularly in the vessels supplying the retina with blood. These vasospasms are temporary narrowings of arteries or arterioles, resulting in insufficient supply of blood to the corresponding organs or parts of organs. Such spasms can occur at various locations in the human body; in this case medical terminology calls it "vasospastic syndrome". Over the years, it has been established that these spasms are usually part of a general dysregulation of blood vessels. These dysregulations can occur in spasms as well as in excessive or insufficient dilation of arteries, veins, and capillaries. The blood vessels of individuals with vasospastic syndrome respond to stimuli insufficiently. If an identifiable disease does not cause this, it is called a primary vascular dysregulation (PVD); in case of an underlying disease, it is called secondary PVD. PVD is almost always associated with other vascular and non-vascular symptoms and signs. This entire complex (PVD and accompanying symptoms) is today called Flammer syndrome.
