= F58 =

F58 may refer to:

- F5/8 type C domain (Discoidin domain) is a major protein domain of many blood coagulation factors
- HMS Hermione (F58), Leander-class frigate of the Royal Navy (RN)

== See also ==
- Athletics at the 2004 Summer Paralympics - Men's discus throw F58
- Athletics at the 2004 Summer Paralympics - Men's javelin throw F58
- Athletics at the 2004 Summer Paralympics - Men's shot put F58
