= Cupping =

Cupping may refer to:

== Medicine ==
- an increase in the cup-to-disc ratio in the eye
- cupping artifact in a CT scan

== Other ==
- Cupping therapy, an alternative health practice and pseudoscience
- Coffee cupping
