= DDR1 =

Protein-coding gene in the species Homo sapiens

Identifiers
- Aliases: DDR1, CAK, CD167, DDR, EHGK2, MCK10, NEP, NTRK4, PTK3, PTK3A, RTK6, TRKE, discoidin domain receptor tyrosine kinase 1
- External IDs: OMIM: 600408; MGI: 99216; GeneCards: DDR1
Available structures
PDB	Ortholog search: PDBe RCSB
PDB	List of PDB id codes 3ZOS, 4AG4, 4BKJ, 4CKR, 5BVK, 5BVN, 5BVO, 5BVW, 5FDP
Enzyme activity
EC #	BRENDA	ExPASy	KEGG	MetaCyc
2.7.10.1	↗	↗	↗	↗

Gene location (Human)
Chr.	Chromosome 6 (human)
Band	6p21.33	Start	30,876,421 bp
Band	6p21.33	End	30,900,156 bp

Gene location (Mouse)
Chr.	Chromosome 17 (mouse)
Band	17 B1|17 18.7 cM	Start	35,992,459 bp
Band	17 B1|17 18.7 cM	End	36,015,513 bp
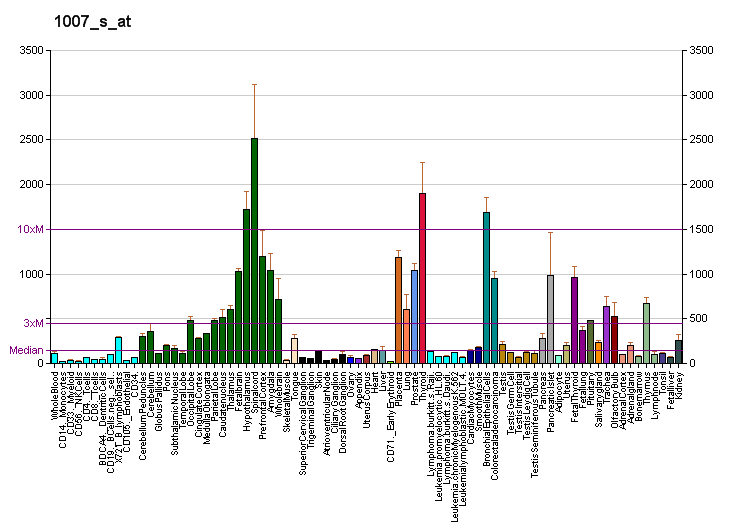

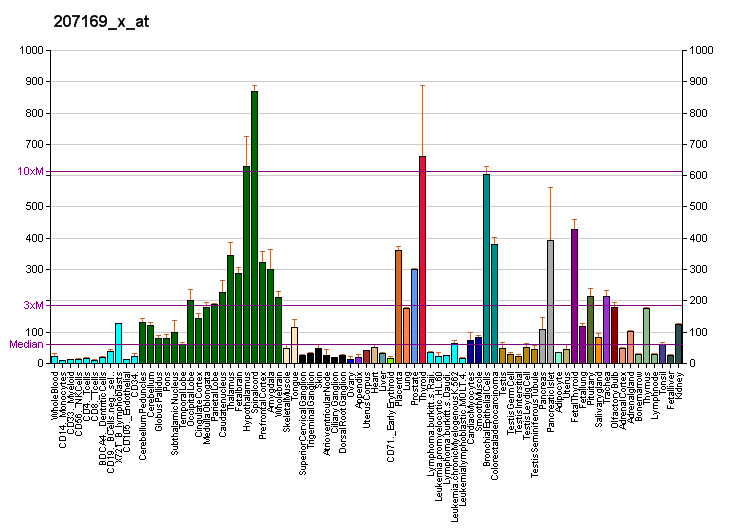

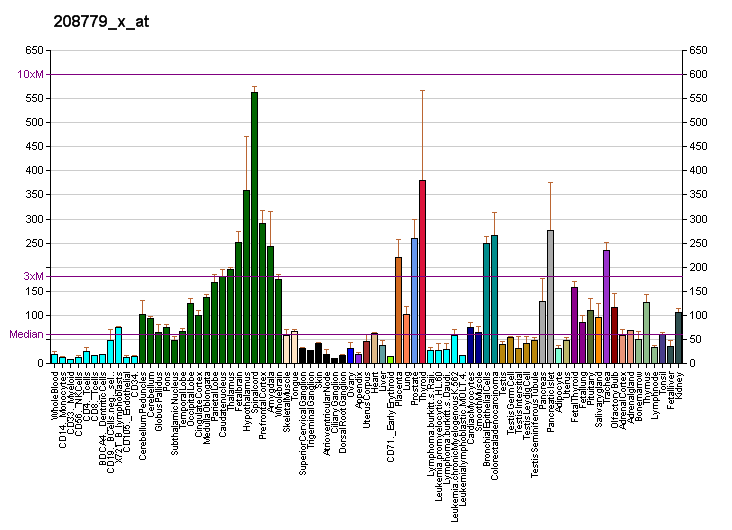
RNA expression pattern
Bgee	Human / Mouse (ortholog); Top expressed in: ventricular zone; right uterine tube; ganglionic eminence; olfactory zone of nasal mucosa; C1 segment; minor salivary glands; islet of Langerhans; skin of abdomen; mucosa of esophagus; substantia nigra / Top expressed in: ciliary body; iris; Epithelium of choroid plexus; retinal pigment epithelium; conjunctival fornix; Rostral migratory stream; medial ganglionic eminence; epithelium of stomach; motor neuron; parotid gland; More reference expression data
BioGPS	More reference expression data
Gene ontology
Molecular function	transferase activity; nucleotide binding; protein kinase activity; collagen binding; metal ion binding; kinase activity; protein binding; transmembrane receptor protein tyrosine kinase activity; protein tyrosine kinase collagen receptor activity; protein tyrosine kinase activity; ATP binding; receptor tyrosine kinase
Cellular component	integral component of membrane; membrane; receptor complex; plasma membrane; integral component of plasma membrane; extracellular region; extracellular exosome; extracellular space
Biological process	collagen-activated tyrosine kinase receptor signaling pathway; branching involved in mammary gland duct morphogenesis; phosphorylation; transmembrane receptor protein tyrosine kinase signaling pathway; female pregnancy; extracellular matrix organization; ear development; mammary gland alveolus development; regulation of extracellular matrix disassembly; smooth muscle cell migration; smooth muscle cell-matrix adhesion; regulation of cell-matrix adhesion; protein phosphorylation; cell adhesion; regulation of cell growth; peptidyl-tyrosine phosphorylation; lactation; wound healing, spreading of cells; embryo implantation; negative regulation of cell population proliferation; peptidyl-tyrosine autophosphorylation; protein autophosphorylation; axon development; neuron projection extension; cell-matrix adhesion; positive regulation of cell population proliferation; cell differentiation; regulation of extracellular matrix organization
Sources:Amigo / QuickGO
Orthologs
Databases	NCBI: entry; OMA: entry
Species	Human	Mouse
Entrez	780	12305
Ensembl	ENSG00000215522; ENSG00000137332; ENSG00000229767; ENSG00000230456; ENSG00000234078 ENSG00000204580; ENSG00000223680	ENSMUSG00000003534
UniProt	Q08345	Q03146
RefSeq (mRNA)	NM_001202521; NM_001202522; NM_001202523; NM_001297652; NM_001297653 NM_001297654; NM_001954; NM_013993; NM_013994	NM_001198831; NM_001198833; NM_007584; NM_172962
RefSeq (protein)	NP_001189450; NP_001189451; NP_001189452; NP_001284581; NP_001284582 NP_001284583; NP_001945; NP_054699; NP_054700; NP_001284583.1; NP_054699.2	NP_001185760; NP_001185762; NP_031610; NP_766550
Location (UCSC)	Chr 6: 30.88 – 30.9 Mb	Chr 17: 35.99 – 36.02 Mb
PubMed search
- Wikidata
View/Edit Human	View/Edit Mouse

Discoidin domain receptor family, member 1, also known as DDR1 or CD167a (cluster of differentiation 167a), is a human gene.

== Function ==
Receptor tyrosine kinases (RTKs) play a key role in the communication of cells with their microenvironment. These molecules are involved in the regulation of cell growth, differentiation and metabolism. The protein encoded by this gene is a RTK that is widely expressed in normal and transformed epithelial cells and is activated by various types of collagen. This protein belongs to a subfamily of tyrosine kinase receptors with a homology region to the Dictyostelium discoideum protein discoidin I in their extracellular domain. Its autophosphorylation is achieved by all collagens so far tested (type I to type VI). A closely related family member is the DDR2 protein. In situ studies and Northern-blot analysis showed that expression of this encoded protein is restricted to epithelial cells, particularly in the kidney, lung, gastrointestinal tract, and brain. In addition, this protein is significantly over-expressed in several human tumors from breast, ovarian, esophageal, and pediatric brain. This gene is located on chromosome 6p21.3 in proximity to several HLA class I genes. Alternative splicing of this gene results in multiple transcript variants.
