= Discoidin domain =

F5/8 type C domain
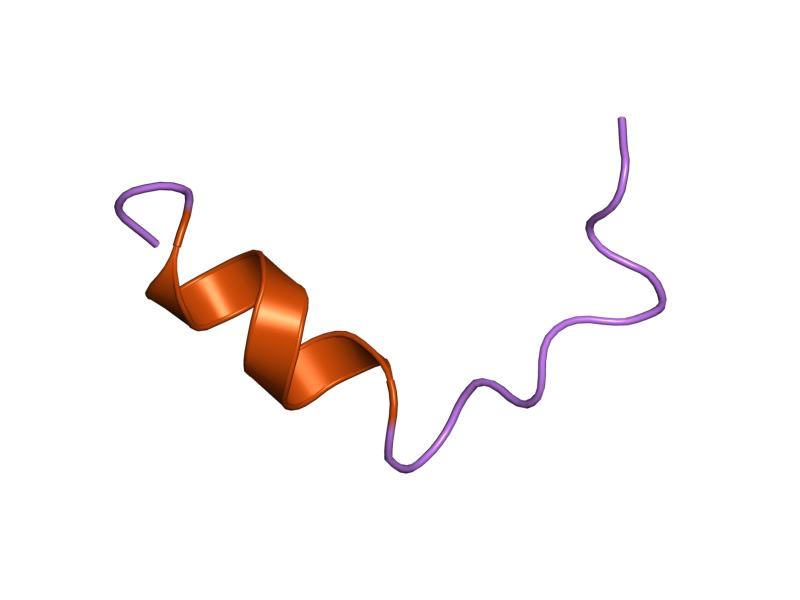
- Structure of the membrane-binding C2 domain of factor VIII.

Identifiers
- Symbol: F5_F8_type_C
- Pfam: PF00754
- InterPro: IPR000421
- PROSITE: PDOC00988
- SCOP2: 1fac / SCOPe / SUPFAM
- OPM superfamily: 46
- OPM protein: 1sdd
- CDD: cd00057
Available protein structures:
- PDB: IPR000421 PF00754 (ECOD; PDBsum)
- AlphaFold: IPR000421; PF00754

Discoidin domain (also known as F5/8 type C domain, or C2-like domain) is major protein domain of many blood coagulation factors.

Blood coagulation factors V and VIII contain a C-terminal, twice repeated, domain of about 150 amino acids, which is often called "C2-like domain" (that is unrelated to the C2 domain). In the Dictyostelium discoideum (Slime mold) cell adhesion protein discoidin, a related domain, named discoidin I-like domain, DLD, or DS, has been found which shares a common C-terminal region of about 110 amino acids with the FA58C domain, but whose N-terminal 40 amino acids are much less conserved. Similar domains have been detected in other extracellular and membrane proteins. In coagulation factors V and VIII the repeated domains compose part of a larger functional domain which promotes binding to anionic phospholipids on the surface of platelets and endothelial cells. The C-terminal domain of the second FA58C repeat (C2) of coagulation factor VIII has been shown to be responsible for phosphatidylserine-binding and essential for activity. FA58C contains two conserved cysteines in most proteins, which link the extremities of the domain by a disulfide bond. A further disulfide bond is located near the C-terminal of the second FA58C domain in MFGM Q08431.

== Human proteins containing this domain ==
AEBP1; BTBD9; CASPR4; CNTNAP1; CNTNAP2; CNTNAP3; CNTNAP4; CNTNAP5; CPXM1; CPXM2; DCBLD1; DCBLD2; DDR1; DDR2; EDIL3; F5; F8; F8B; MFGE8; NRP1; NRP2; RS1; SSPO; UNC13A
