= Optic cup =

Optic cup may refer to:

- Optic cup (anatomical), the white cup-like area in the center of the optic disc
- Optic cup (embryology), a structure in embryos that gives rise to the retina of the eye
