= Hypotension =

Abnormally low blood pressure

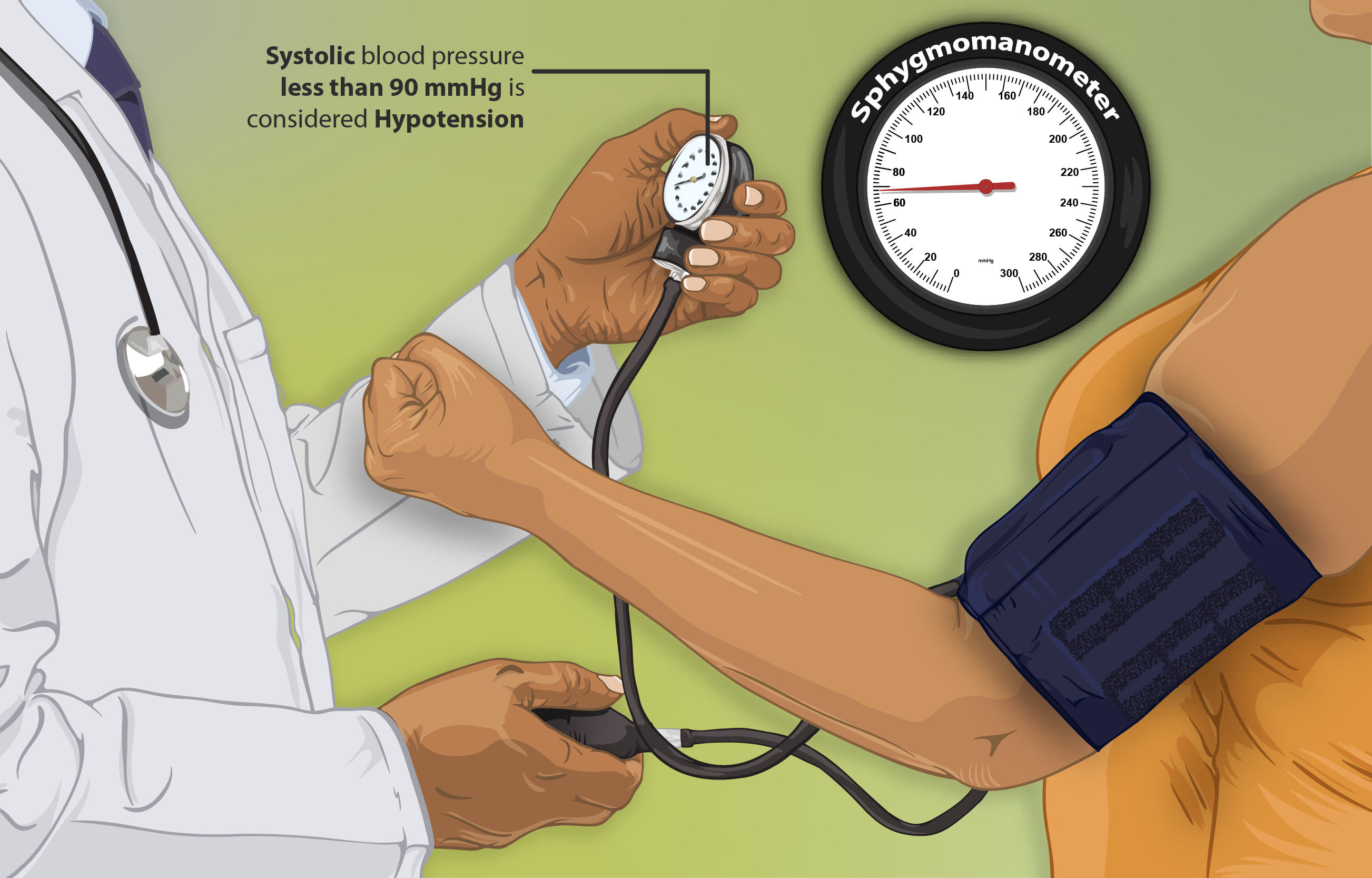
- Depiction of a hypotension (low blood pressure) patient getting her blood pressure checked
- Image showing a patient having blood pressure checked. Systolic blood pressure less than 90 mmHg is considered hypotension (low blood pressure)
- Specialty: Cardiology
- Symptoms: Dizziness, clumsiness, giddiness, headache, lightheadedness, fatigue, nausea, blurred vision, shakiness, breathlessness, increased thirst, irregular heartbeat, chest pain, fever, seizures
- Complications: Fainting, bleeding
- Risk factors: Older patient, Malnourishment
- Diagnostic method: Physical examination, based on symptoms and blood pressure
- Treatment: Intravenous fluid

Hypotension, also known as low blood pressure, is a cardiovascular condition characterized by abnormally reduced blood pressure. Blood pressure is the force of blood pushing against the walls of the arteries as the heart pumps out blood and is indicated by two numbers, the systolic blood pressure (the top number) and the diastolic blood pressure (the bottom number), which are the maximum and minimum blood pressures within the cardiac cycle, respectively. A systolic blood pressure of less than 90 millimeters of mercury (mmHg) or diastolic of less than 60 mmHg is generally considered to be hypotension. Different numbers apply to children. However, in practice, blood pressure is considered too low only if noticeable symptoms are present.

Symptoms may include feeling tired, dizziness, confusion, weakness, headache, blurred vision, nausea, neck or back pain, an irregular heartbeat or feeling that the heart is skipping beats or fluttering, and near fainting or fainting. Hypotension is the opposite of hypertension, which is high blood pressure. It is best understood as a physiological state rather than a disease.

Causes of low blood pressure possibly can include, severe dehydration from excessive vomiting and/or sweating and excessive heat, blood loss from injury, vasodilation, anaphylaxis, hormonal changes, as in pregnancy, medications to treat high blood pressure or Parkinson's, and heart, endocrine, and neurological problems. There are also syndromes that can cause hypotension in patients including orthostatic hypotension, vasovagal syncope, and other rarer conditions.

For some people who exercise and are in top physical condition, low blood pressure could be normal. A single session of exercise can induce hypotension, and water-based exercise can induce a hypotensive response. For many people, excessively low blood pressure can cause dizziness and fainting or indicate serious heart, endocrine or neurological disorders. Severely low blood pressure can deprive the brain and other vital organs of oxygen and nutrients, leading to a life-threatening condition called shock. Shock is classified based on the underlying cause, including hypovolemic shock, cardiogenic shock, distributive shock, and obstructive shock.

Treatment depends on the cause of the low blood pressure. Treatment of hypotension may include the use of intravenous fluids or vasopressors. When using vasopressors, trying to achieve a mean arterial pressure (MAP) of greater than 70 mmHg does not appear to result in better outcomes than trying to achieve an MAP of greater than 65 mmHg in adults. Increased salt and fluid intake, and wear compression stockings when standing for long periods, may be recommended.

== Signs and symptoms ==
For some people, low blood pressure goes unnoticed. For many people, low blood pressure may result in symptoms that can include:

- confusion
- dizziness or lightheadedness
- feeling tired and weak
- heart palpitations, or feelings that heart is skipping a beat, fluttering, or beating too hard or too fast
- headache
- nausea
- fevers
- severe back or neck pain
- stiff neck
- cold, and clammy skin
- blurring or temporary loss of vision
- painful or difficult urination
- tinnitus
- seizures
- loss of consciousness

Older adults also have a higher risk of symptoms of low blood pressure, such as falls, fainting, or dizziness when standing or after a meal. If the blood pressure is sufficiently low, fainting (syncope) may occur.

== Causes ==
Low blood pressure can have a various of causes. Some health problems, and the use of certain medications can cause it. Other factors also can affect blood pressure. Reduced blood volume, such as bleeding from injury or internal bleeding, severe dehydration from excessive vomiting and/or sweating, excessive heat, and strenuous exercise, is the most common cause of low blood pressure.

Other conditions that can cause low blood pressure include:

- widening of blood vessels
- allergic shock
- hormonal changes, such as, with pregnancy
- heart problems, including arrhythmias, heart failure, bradycardia, and other heart conditions
- problems with the autonomic nervous system, such as in diabetes, vitamin B_{12} deficiency, Parkinson's disease, and other neurological disorders
- endocrine problems, such as in Addison's disease
- septic shock
- certain medications to treat high blood pressure, Parkinson's disease, and heart disease

More serious anemia, that often happens quickly, can cause low blood pressure, confusion, and rapid heartbeat. Hypovolemia can be induced also by excessive use of diuretics. Low blood pressure may also be attributed to heat stroke which can be indicated by absence of perspiration, light headedness and dark colored urine.

Other medications can produce hypotension by different mechanisms. Chronic use of alpha blockers or beta blockers can lead to hypotension. Beta blockers can cause hypotension both by slowing the heart rate and by decreasing the pumping ability of the heart muscle.

Decreased cardiac output despite normal blood volume, due to severe congestive heart failure, a large heart attack, heart valve problems, or extremely low heart rate (bradycardia), often produces hypotension and can rapidly progress to cardiogenic shock. Arrhythmias often result in hypotension by this mechanism.

Excessive vasodilation, or insufficient constriction of the blood vessels (mostly arterioles), causes hypotension. This can be due to decreased sympathetic nervous system output or to increased parasympathetic activity occurring as a consequence of injury to the brain or spinal cord. Dysautonomia, an intrinsic abnormality in autonomic system functioning, can also lead to hypotension. Excessive vasodilation can also result from sepsis, acidosis, or medications, such as nitrate preparations, calcium channel blockers, or AT1 receptor antagonists (Angiotensin II acts on AT1 receptors). Many anesthetic agents and techniques, including spinal anesthesia and most inhalational agents, produce significant vasodilation.

Lower blood pressure is a side effect of certain herbal medicines, which can also interact with several medications. An example is the theobromine in Theobroma cacao, which lowers blood pressure through its actions as both a vasodilator and a diuretic, and has been used to treat high blood pressure.

Hypotension can be a symptom of mast cell activation syndrome (MCAS).

=== Syndromes ===
==== Orthostatic hypotension ====
Orthostatic hypotension, also called postural hypotension, is a common form of low blood pressure. It occurs after a change in body position, typically when a person stands up from either a seated or lying position. It is usually transient and represents a delay in the normal compensatory ability of the autonomic nervous system. It is commonly seen in hypovolemia and as a result of various medications. In addition to blood pressure-lowering medications, many psychiatric medications, in particular antidepressants, can have this side effect. Simple blood pressure and heart rate measurements while lying, seated, and standing (with a two-minute delay in between each position change) can confirm the presence of orthostatic hypotension. Taking these measurements is known as orthostatic vitals. Orthostatic hypotension is indicated if there is a drop of 20 mmHg in systolic pressure (and a 10 mmHg drop in diastolic pressure in some facilities) and a 20 beats per minute increase in heart rate.

==== Vasovagal syncope ====
Vasovagal syncope is a form of dysautonomia characterized by an inappropriate drop in blood pressure while in the upright position. Vasovagal syncope occurs as a result of increased activity of the vagus nerve, the mainstay of the parasympathetic nervous system. Patients will feel sudden, unprovoked lightheadedness, sweating, changes in vision, and finally a loss of consciousness. Consciousness will often return rapidly once the patient is lying down and the blood pressure returns to normal.

==== Other ====
Another, but rarer form, is postprandial hypotension, a drastic decline in blood pressure that occurs 30 to 75 minutes after eating substantial meals. When a great deal of blood is diverted to the intestines (a kind of "splanchnic blood pooling") to facilitate digestion and absorption, the body must increase cardiac output and peripheral vasoconstriction to maintain enough blood pressure to perfuse vital organs, such as the brain. Postprandial hypotension is believed to be caused by the autonomic nervous system not compensating appropriately, because of aging or a specific disorder.

Hypotension is a feature of Flammer syndrome, which is characterized by cold hands and feet and predisposes to normal tension glaucoma.

Hypotension can be a symptom of relative energy deficiency in sport, sometimes known as the female athlete triad, although it can also affect men.

== Pathophysiology ==
Blood pressure is continuously regulated by the autonomic nervous system, using an elaborate network of receptors, nerves, and hormones to balance the effects of the sympathetic nervous system, which tends to raise blood pressure, and the parasympathetic nervous system, which lowers it. The vast and rapid compensation abilities of the autonomic nervous system allow normal individuals to maintain an acceptable blood pressure over a wide range of activities and in many disease states. Even small alterations in these networks can lead to hypotension.

== Diagnosis ==
Hypotension thresholds (mmHg)
Office	Ambulatory		
Office	Daytime	Nighttime	24 hours
<110/70	<105/65	<90/50	<100/60

For most adults, the optimal blood pressure is at or below 120/80 mmHg. If the systolic blood pressure is <90 mmHg or the diastolic blood pressure is <60 mmHg, it would be classified as hypotension. However, occasional blood pressure readings below 90/60 mmHg are not infrequent in the general population, and, in the absence of some pathological cause, hypotension appears to be a relatively benign condition in most people. The diagnosis of hypotension is usually made by measuring blood pressure, either non-invasively with a sphygmomanometer or invasively with an arterial catheter (mostly in an intensive care setting). Another way to diagnose low blood pressure is by using the mean arterial pressure (MAP) measured using an arterial catheter or by continuous, non-invasive hemodynamic monitoring which measures intra-operative blood pressure beat-by-beat throughout surgery. A MAP <65 mmHg is considered hypotension. Intra-operative hypotension <65 mmHg can lead to an increased risk of acute kidney injury, myocardial injury or post-operative stroke. While an incidental finding of hypotension during a routine blood pressure measurement may not be particularly worrying, a substantial drop in blood pressure following standing, exercise, or eating can be associated with symptoms and may have implications for future health. A drop in blood pressure after standing, termed postural or orthostatic hypotension, is defined as a decrease in supine-to-standing BP >20 mm Hg systolic or >10 mm Hg diastolic within 3 minutes of standing. Orthostatic hypotension is associated with increased risk of future cardiovascular events and mortality. Orthostatic vitals are frequently measured to assist with the diagnosis of orthostatic hypotension, and may involve the use of a tilt table test to evaluate vasovagal syncope.

== Treatment ==
Treatment depends on the cause of the low blood pressure. Treatment may not be needed for asymptomatic low blood pressure. Depending on symptoms, treatment may include drinking more fluids to prevent dehydration, taking medicines to raise blood pressure, or adjusting medicines that cause low blood pressure. Adding electrolytes to a diet can relieve symptoms of mild hypotension, and a morning dose of caffeine can also be effective. Chronic hypotension rarely exists as more than a symptom. In mild cases, where the patient is still responsive, lying the person on their back and lifting the legs increases venous return, thus making more blood available to critical organs in the chest and head. The Trendelenburg position, though used historically, is no longer recommended.

Hypotensive shock treatment always follows the following four steps. Outcomes, in terms of mortality, are directly linked to the speed at which hypotension is corrected. Still-debated methods are in parentheses, as are benchmarks for evaluating progress in correcting hypotension. A study on septic shock provided the delineation of these general principles. However, since it focuses on hypotension due to infection, it does not apply to all forms of severe hypotension.

1. Volume resuscitation (usually with crystalloid or blood products)
2. Blood pressure support with a vasopressor (all seem equivalent concerning risk of death, with norepinephrine possibly better than dopamine). Trying to achieve a mean arterial pressure (MAP) of greater than 70 mmHg does not appear to result in better outcomes than trying to achieve a MAP of greater than 65 mmHg in adults.
3. Ensure adequate tissue perfusion (maintain SvO2 >70 with use of blood or dobutamine)
4. Address the underlying problem (e.g., antibiotic for infection, stent or coronary artery bypass graft surgery for infarction, corticosteroids for adrenal insufficiency)

The best way to determine if a person will benefit from fluids is by doing a passive leg raise followed by measuring the output from the heart.

=== Medication ===
Chronic hypotension sometimes requires the use of medications. Some medications that are commonly used include fludrocortisone, erythropoietin, and sympathomimetics such as midodrine and norepinephrine and its precursor (L-DOPS).

- Fludrocortisone is the first-line therapy (in the absence of heart failure) for patients with chronic hypotension or resistant orthostatic hypotension. It works by increasing the intravascular volume.
- Midodrine is a therapy used for severe orthostatic hypotension, and works by increasing peripheral vascular resistance.
- Norepinephrine and its precursor L-DOPS are used for primary autonomic dysfunction by increasing vascular tone.
- Erythropoietin is given to patients with neurogenic orthostatic hypotension, and it works through increasing vascular volume and viscosity.

== Pediatrics ==
The definition of hypotension changes in the pediatric population depending on the child's age, as seen in the table below.

Pediatric hypotension
Age	Systolic pressure
Term neonates	<60 mmHg
Infants	<70 mmHg
Children 1–10 years	<70 + (age in years x 2) mmHg
Children >10 years	<90 mmHg

The clinical history provided by the caretaker is the most important part in determining the cause of hypotension in pediatric patients. Symptoms for children with hypotension include increased sleepiness, not using the restroom as much (or at all), having difficulty breathing or breathing rapidly, or syncope. The treatment for hypotension in pediatric patients is similar to the treatment in adults by following the four first steps listed above (see Treatment). Children are more likely to undergo intubation during the treatment of hypotension because their oxygen levels drop more rapidly than adults. The closing of fetal shunts following birth can create instability in the "transitional circulation" of the fetus, and often creates a state of hypotension following birth; while many infants can overcome this hypotension through the closing of shunts, a mean blood pressure (MBP) of lower than 30 mmHg is correlated with severe cerebral injury and can be experienced by premature infants who have poor shunt closure.

== Etymology ==
Hypotension, from Ancient Greek hypo-, meaning "under" or "less" + English tension, meaning "'strain" or "tightness". This refers to the under-constriction of the blood vessels and arteries which leads to low blood pressure.
