= Josef Flammer =

Swiss ophthalmologist (born 1948)

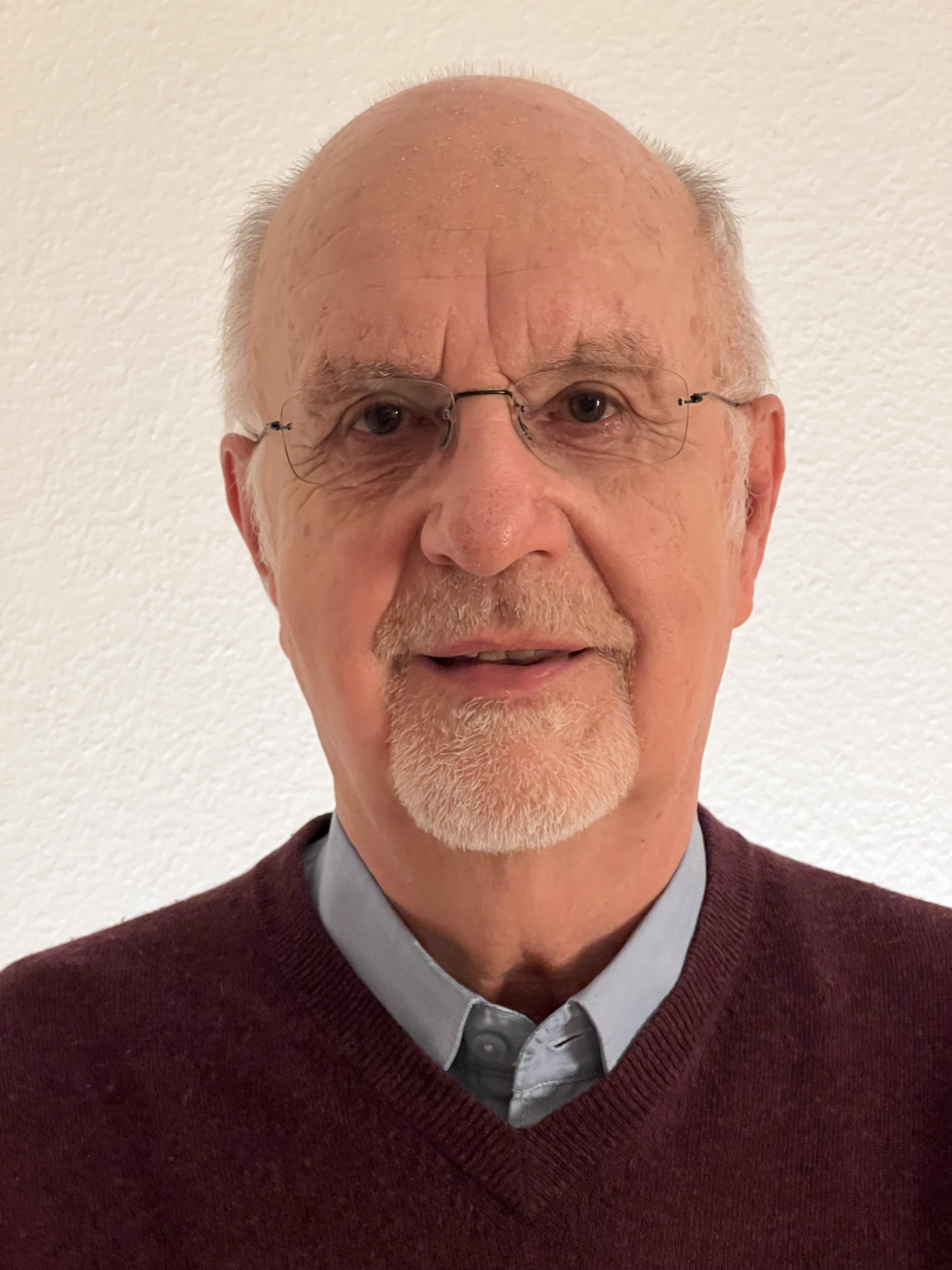
- Josef Flammer (2022)
- Born: April 21, 1948 (age 78)
- Known for: Flammer syndrome
- Scientific career
- Institutions: Basel University Hospital

Josef Flammer (born April 21, 1948) is a Swiss ophthalmologist and long-time director of the Eye Clinic at Basel University Hospital. Flammer is a glaucoma specialist who developed a new pathogenetic concept of glaucomatous damage according to which unstable blood supply leads to oxidative stress, which in turn plays a major role in apoptosis (cell death) of cells in the optic nerve and retina in glaucoma patients.

== Scientific works ==
Flammer's scientific and medical endeavors were generally interdisciplinary. His first research focus was automatic perimetry for which he established normal values; he studied short term and long term fluctuations of the human visual field and described influencing factors. Together with Hans Bebie, he developed the so-called Bebie curve, which plays a major role in the diagnosis of visual field loss due to glaucoma, he introduced the visual field indices. Flammer was one of the first researchers to demonstrate systemic side effects of locally administered beta blockers (i.e. eye drops) in ophthalmology. Flammer and his collaborators found that intraocular pressure variation is as important for the development of glaucoma, one of the main causes of blindness worldwide, as a constantly elevated intraocular pressure, long considered the main, if not the only, cause of glaucoma. In numerous research projects he demonstrated that glaucoma could be caused by a dysregulation of ocular blood flow, even at normal levels of intraocular pressure. Flammer discovered that vasospasms in the eye are a manifestation of a general vasospastic syndrome. Later, he noted that such spasms are only the tip of the iceberg and an indication of a much more generalized vascular dysregulation in the human body. This increases the risk of eye disease, in particular of normal tension glaucoma. Flammer noted that people with a primary vascular dysregulation have other symptoms and signs; this led to the establishment of the term Flammer syndrome. Flammer also demonstrated the relationship between eye disease and heart disease. In numerous laboratory studies, he contributed to the understanding of the role of endothelin - which according to his studies regulates retinal venous pressure - and nitric oxide in ocular perfusion. He also described the pathogenic role of ocular blood flow in retinitis pigmentosa.

== Publishing and education ==
In addition to hundreds of original papers, Flammer is the author of several books. His book "Glaucoma", intended for the general public, has so far been published in 22 languages and went through 30 different editions; "Glaucoma" is thus considered the world's most widely used non-fiction book on this ocular disease. His "Basic Sciences in Ophthalmology" has received praise for demonstrating the role of chemistry and physics in modern ophthalmological diagnostics and therapies. The Basel Eye Clinic organizes each year - as initiated by Flammer - one of the most renowned conferences for ophthalmologists in Europe, the Basel Ophthalmo Meeting.

== Writings (by him, selection) ==
- Josef Flammer, Maneli Mozaffarieh, Hans Bebie: Basic Sciences in Ophthalmology: Physics and Chemistry. Springer, Heidelberg and New York 2013. ISBN 978-3-642-32260-0.
- Josef Flammer: Glaucoma: A Guide for Patients, An Introduction for Care Providers, A Quick Reference. Hogrefe and Huber Publishing, Berne, Switzerland 2006. 978-0889373426
- Flammer J, Konieczka K, Bruno RM, Virdis A, Flammer AJ, Taddei S. The eye and the heart. Eur Heart J 34,1270-1278 (2013) [Epub 2013]
- M. Mozaffarieh, J. Flammer: New insights in the pathogenesis and treatment of normal tension glaucoma. Curr Opin Pharmacol 2013 Feb;13(1):43-49.
- Josef Flammer: The role of ocular blood flow in the pathogenesis of glaucomatous damage. US Ophthalmic Review 4(2):84-87 (2011)
- Maneli Mozzafarieh, Josef Flammer: Ocular Blood Flow and Glaucomatous Optic Neuropathy. Springer, Heidelberg und New York 2009, ISBN 978-3-540-69442-7

== Literature ==
- Ronald D. Gerste [Article in German]: Normaldruckglaukom und vaskuläre Dysregulationen: Augenleiden mit Tinnitus und kalten Extremitäten. Deutsches Ärzteblatt 2014; 111:A 308.
- Ronald D. Gerste [Article in German]: Wie ein kalter Händedruck Medizingeschichte schrieb. [How a cold handshake was making medical history]. Schweizer Ärztezeitung 2018; 99:118-120.
- Kunin A, Polivka J Jr, Moiseeva N et al.:"Dry mouth" and "Flammer" syndromes-neglected risks in adolescents and new concepts by predictive, preventive and personalised approach. EPMA Journal 2018, 2;9(3):307-317.
- Konieczka K, Erb C: Diseases potentially related to Flammer syndrome. EPMA J. 2017 Sep 13;8(4):327-332
- Peter Meyer [Article in German]: Geschichte der Universitäts-Augenklinik Basel.[History of the University Eye Clinic Basel] In: 100 Jahre SOG und die Entwicklung der Schweizer Augenheilkunde. Le Centenaire de la SSO et le développement de l'Ophthalmologie en Suisse. Ed.by Ulrike Novotny and Albert Franceschetti, Horw (Switzerland) 2007.
