= Retinoschisis =

Eye disease involving splitting of the retina

- This condition is usually inherited in an X-linked recessive manner.
- Specialty: Ophthalmology

Retinoschisis is an eye disease characterized by the abnormal splitting of the retina's neurosensory layers, usually in the outer plexiform layer. Retinoschisis can be divided into degenerative forms which are very common and almost exclusively involve the peripheral retina and hereditary forms which are rare and involve the central retina and sometimes the peripheral retina. The degenerative forms are asymptomatic and involve the peripheral retina only and do not affect the visual acuity. Some rarer forms result in a loss of vision in the corresponding visual field.

Almost all cases are X-linked recessive and caused by a mutation in the retinoschisin gene (RS1).

== Classification ==
- Hereditary
  - X linked juvenile retinoschisis
  - Familial foveal retinoschisis
- Tractional
- Exudative
  - Secondary to optic disc pit
- Degenerative
  - Typical
  - Reticular

=== Degenerative retinoschisis ===
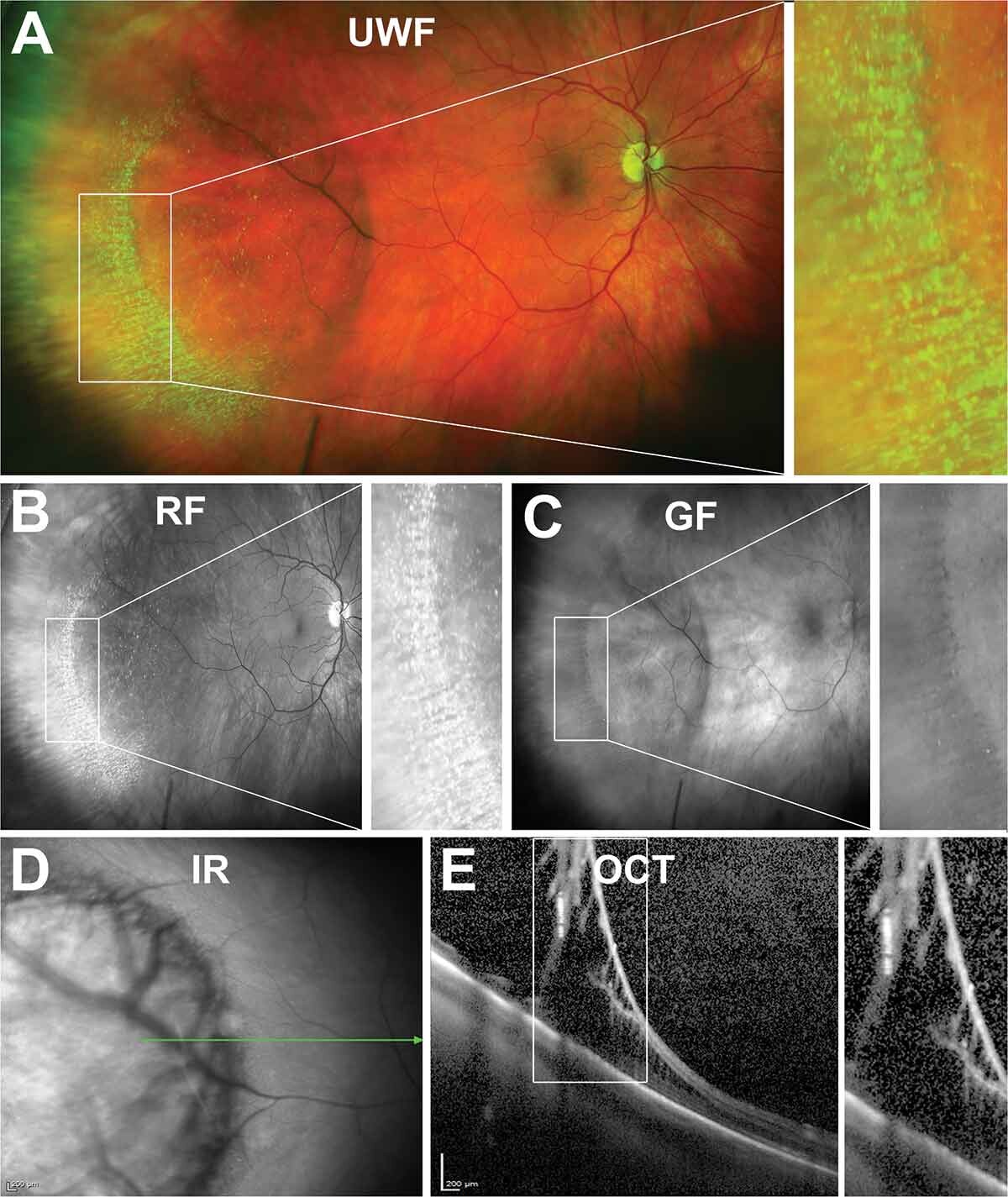
Retinal images of 86 year old with degenerative retinoschisis. A to D show the dome shape typical when retinoschisis occurs, while the optical coherence tomography image (E) shows the split retinal layers. Taken by Centre for Eye Health, UNSW.

This type of retinoschisis is very common with a prevalence of up to 7 percent in normal persons. Its cause is unknown. It can easily be confused with retinal detachment by the non-expert observer and in difficult cases even the expert may have difficulty differentiating the two. Such differentiation is important since retinal detachment almost always requires treatment while retinoschisis never itself requires treatment and leads to retinal detachment (and hence to visual loss) only occasionally. Unfortunately one still sees cases of uncomplicated retinoschisis treated by laser retinopexy or cryopexy in an attempt to stop its progression towards the macula. Such treatments are not only ineffective but unnecessarily risk complications. There is no documented case in the literature of degenerative retinoschisis itself (as opposed to the occasional situation of retinal detachment complicating retinoschisis) in which the splitting of the retina has progressed through the fovea. There is no clinical utility in differentiating between typical and reticular retinoschisis. Degenerative retinoschisis is not known to be a genetically inherited condition. There is always vision loss in the region of the schisis as the sensory retina is separated from the ganglion layer. But as the loss is in the periphery, it goes unnoticed. It is the very rare schisis that encroaches on the macula where retinopexy is then properly used.

=== Hereditary retinoschisis ===
Hereditary retinoschisis is derived from a defective retinoschisin protein, which is due to an X-linked genetic defect. The genetic form of this disease usually starts during childhood and is called X-linked juvenile retinoschisis (XLRS) or congenital retinoschisis. Affected males are usually identified in grade school, but occasionally are identified as young infants.

It is estimated that this much less common form of retinoschisis affects one in 5,000 to 25,000 individuals, primarily young males. Schisis is derived from the Greek word meaning splitting, describing the splitting of the retinal layers from each other. However, schisis is a word fragment, and the term retinoschisis should be used, as should the term iridoschisis when describing splitting of the iris. If the retinoschisis involves the macula, then the high-resolution central area of vision used to view detail is lost, and this is one form of macular disease. Although it might be described by some as a "degeneration", the term macular degeneration should be reserved for the specific disease "age-related macular degeneration".

Very few affected individuals go completely blind from retinoschisis, but some sufferers have very limited reading vision and are "legally blind". Visual acuity can be reduced to less than 20/200 in both eyes. Individuals affected by XLRS are at an increased risk for retinal detachment and eye hemorrhage, among other potential complications.

Retinoschisis causes acuity loss in the center of the visual field through the formation of tiny cysts in the retina, often forming a "spoke-wheel" pattern that can be very subtle. The cysts are usually only detectable by a trained clinician. In some cases vision cannot be improved by glasses, as the nerve tissue itself is damaged by these cysts.

The National Eye Institute (NEI) of the National Institutes of Health (NIH) is conducting clinical and genetic studies of X-linked juvenile retinoschisis. This study began in 2003 and as of 2018 is continuing to recruit patients. A better understanding of why and how XLRS develops might lead to improved treatments. Males diagnosed with X-linked juvenile retinoschisis and females who are suspected carriers may be eligible to participate. In addition to giving a medical history and submitting medical records, participants submit a blood sample and the NEI will perform a genetic analysis. There is no cost to participate in this study.

=== Tractional retinoschisis ===
This may be present in conditions causing traction on the retina especially at the macula. This may occur in: a) The vitreomacular traction syndrome; b) Proliferative diabetic retinopathy with vitreoretinal traction; c) Atypical cases of impending macular hole.

=== Exudative retinoschisis ===
Retinoschisis involving the central part of the retina secondary to an optic disc pit was erroneously considered to be a serous retinal detachment until correctly described by Lincoff as retinoschisis. Significant visual loss may occur and following a period of observation for spontaneous resolution, treatment with temporal peripapillary laser photocoagulation followed by vitrectomy and gas injection followed by face-down positioning is very effective in treating this condition.

== Diagnosis ==
The diagnosis of the disease is usually made during an examination of the back of the eye (fundus) where any splits, tears or rips may be seen. One diagnostic tool is optical coherence tomography (OCT), which uses light waves to create images of the retina and based on ophthalmoscopy with scleral depression and contact lens examination. The fellow eye should also be examined.

== Treatment ==
Retinoschisis usually does not require treatment aside from glasses to improve vision. However, some children with X-linked retinoschisis may have bleeding in their eye. This can be treated with either laser therapy or cryosurgery. In rare cases, children may need surgery to stop the bleeding.

=== Gene therapy ===
As of 2022, a clinical trial of gene therapy to treat XLRS was ongoing. After 1 year, the paper concluded that the therapy "was generally safe and well tolerated but failed to demonstrate a measurable treatment effect" and a 5-year follow up will be conducted to assess long-term safety.

=== Gene editing ===
There may be various gene editing techniques to possibly treat hereditary retinoschisis.
