= Retinoschisin =

Protein-coding gene in the species Homo sapiens

RS1
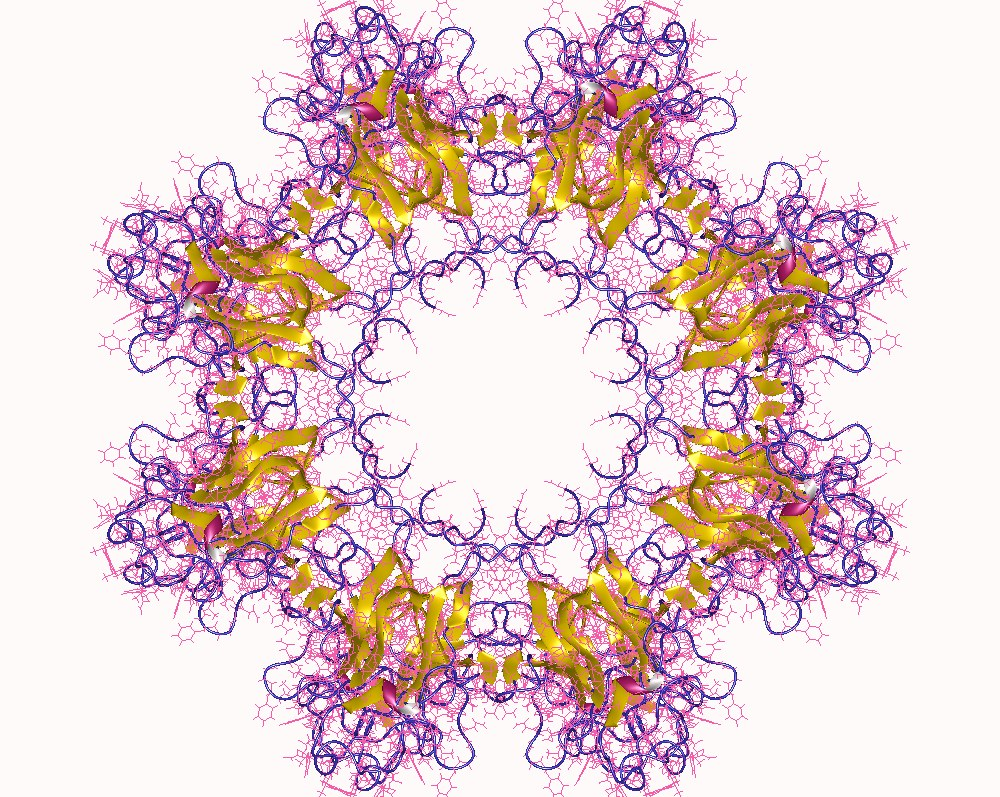
Available structures
PDB	Ortholog search: PDBe RCSB
PDB	List of PDB id codes 3JD6

Identifiers
- Aliases: RS1, RS, XLretinoschisin 1
- External IDs: OMIM: 300839; MGI: 1336189; HomoloGene: 279; GeneCards: RS1; OMA:RS1 - orthologs

Gene location (Human)
Chr.	X chromosome (human)
Band	Xp22.13	Start	18,639,688 bp
Band	Xp22.13	End	18,672,108 bp

Gene location (Mouse)
Chr.	X chromosome (mouse)
Band	X F4|X 73.95 cM	Start	159,551,009 bp
Band	X F4|X 73.95 cM	End	159,582,659 bp
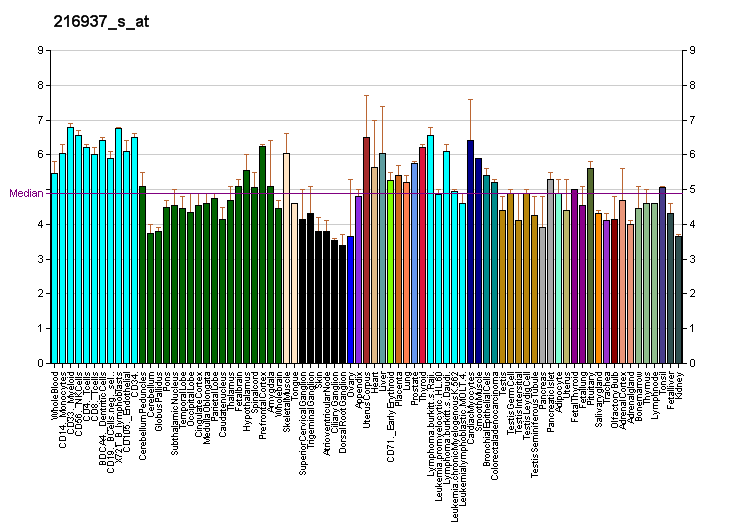

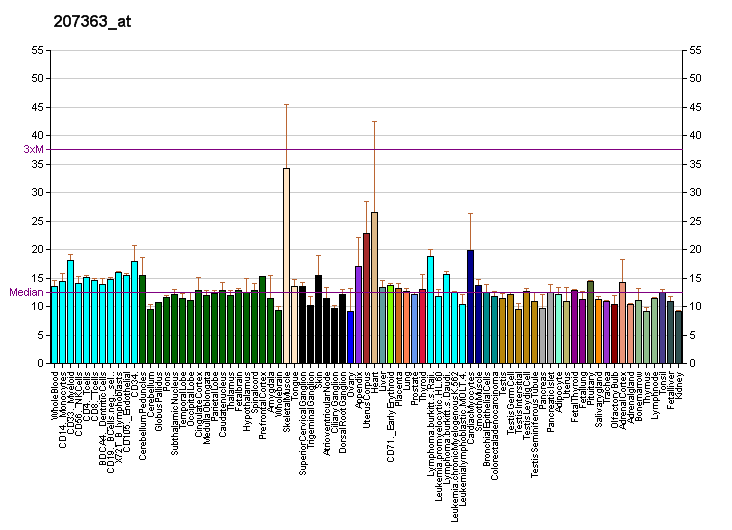
RNA expression pattern
Bgee	Human / Mouse (ortholog); Top expressed in: testicle; oocyte; secondary oocyte; upper lobe of left lung; lower lobe of lung; right lung; prefrontal cortex; retinal pigment epithelium; primary visual cortex; right lobe of thyroid gland / Top expressed in: neural layer of retina; retinal pigment epithelium; epithelium of lens; ciliary body; iris; tibiofemoral joint; morula; embryo; tail of embryo; pineal gland; More reference expression data
BioGPS	More reference expression data
Gene ontology
Molecular function	phosphatidylinositol-4-phosphate binding; phosphatidylinositol-5-phosphate binding; phosphatidylinositol-4,5-bisphosphate binding; phosphatidylinositol-3-phosphate binding; phosphatidylinositol-3,4,5-trisphosphate binding; phosphatidylinositol-3,5-bisphosphate binding; phosphatidylinositol-3,4-bisphosphate binding; oligosaccharide binding; phosphatidylserine binding; lipid binding
Cellular component	extracellular region; extrinsic component of plasma membrane; extracellular space; plasma membrane; membrane
Biological process	multicellular organism development; cell adhesion; retina layer formation; response to stimulus; adaptation of rhodopsin mediated signaling; visual perception; protein homooligomerization
Sources:Amigo / QuickGO
Orthologs
Species	Human	Mouse
Entrez	6247	20147
Ensembl	ENSG00000102104	ENSMUSG00000031293
UniProt	O15537	Q9Z1L4
RefSeq (mRNA)	NM_000330	NM_011302
RefSeq (protein)	NP_000321	NP_035432
Location (UCSC)	Chr X: 18.64 – 18.67 Mb	Chr X: 159.55 – 159.58 Mb
PubMed search
- Wikidata
View/Edit Human	View/Edit Mouse

Retinoschisin also known as X-linked juvenile retinoschisis protein is a lectin that in humans is encoded by the RS1 gene.

It is a soluble, cell-surface protein that plays an important role in the maintenance of the retina where it is expressed and secreted by retinal bipolar cells and photoreceptors, as well as in the pineal gland. Retinoschisin (RS1) is encoded by the gene RS1 located on the X chromosome at p22.1. Young males who have an RS1 mutation are susceptible to retinoschisis, an X-linked eye disease which causes macular degeneration and can lead to a loss of vision.

== Function ==
Retinoschisin is an extracellular protein that plays a crucial role in the cellular organization of the retina: it binds the plasma membranes of various retinal cells tightly to maintain the structure of the retina. In addition to enabling cell-to-cell adhesion, it has been shown that retinoschisin interacts with the sodium/potassium-ATPase (Na/K-ATPase) which resides in the plasma membrane. RS1 also plays a role in the regulation on intracellular MAP kinase signalling.

== Structure ==
The retinoschisin monomer is 224 amino acids long, including a 23-amino acid signal peptide essential for secretion (this is cleaved off before the protein becomes functional), and a highly conserved sequence motif called the discoidin domain which consists of 157 amino acids, important for the protein's function in cell to cell adhesion. However, its oligomeric structure is a pairing of back-to-back octamers, forming a homo16mer . This structure allows it to adhere to the plasma membrane of retinal cells such as bipolar and photoreceptor cells, joining them together.

== Clinical significance ==
Pathogenic mutations of this gene are responsible for X-linked retinoschisis an early-onset macular degeneration in males that results in a splitting of the inner layers of the retina and severe loss in vision. Female carriers of the RS1 mutation do not show symptoms of X-linked juvenile retinoschisis, except in rare cases where the non-functional protein is expressed due to anomalous X-chromosome inactivation. In young males who carry a gene mutation, the disease presents itself as retinal cavities, splitting of inner retinal layers (also known as foveal schisis), and defective synapse activity. Retinas that lack mature retinoshisin develop these characteristics in up to 1 in 5,000 males. There are over 200 mutations of RS1 recorded in the Retina International Mutation Database, most of which are not pathogenic.
