= Orthostatic vital signs =

Orthostatic vital signs are a series of vital signs of a patient taken while the patient is supine, then again while standing. The results are only meaningful if performed in the correct order (starting with supine position). Used to identify orthostatic hypotension, orthostatic vital signs are commonly taken in triage medicine when a patient presents with vomiting, diarrhea or abdominal pain; with fever; with bleeding; or with syncope, dizziness or weakness. Orthostatic vital signs are not collected where spinal injury seems likely or where the patient is displaying an altered level of consciousness. Additionally, it is omitted when the patient is demonstrating hemodynamic instability, which term is generally used to indicate abnormal or unstable blood pressure but which can also suggest inadequate arterial supply to organs. Orthostatic vital signs are also taken after surgery.

A patient is considered to have orthostatic hypotension when the systolic blood pressure falls by more than 20 mm Hg, the diastolic blood pressure falls by more than 10 mm Hg, or the pulse rises by more than 20 beats per minute within 3 minutes of standing
