= Morning glory disc anomaly =

Congenital deformity of the optic nerve

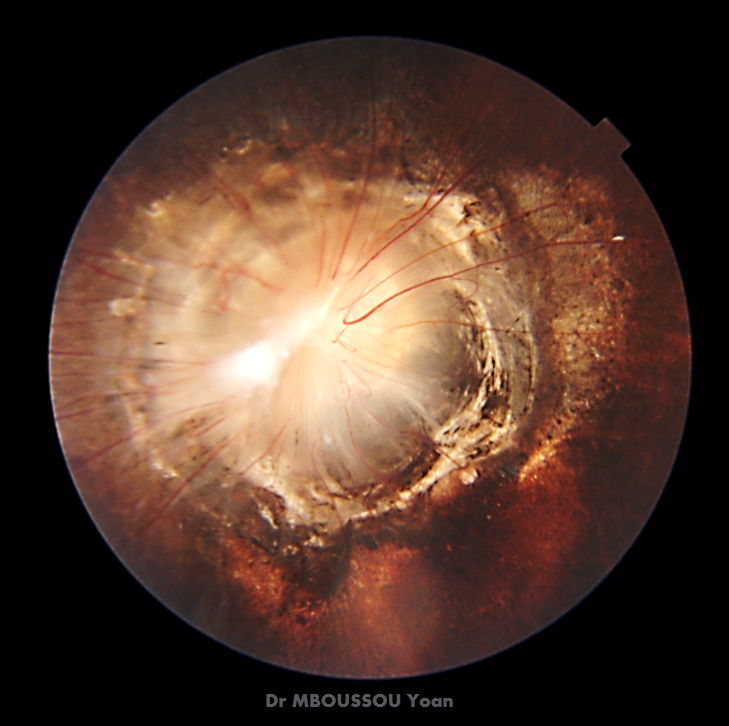
- Morning glory disc retinography
- Specialty: Medical genetics

The morning glory disc anomaly (MGDA) is a congenital deformity resulting from failure of the optic nerve to completely form in utero. The term was coined in 1970 by Kindler, noting a resemblance of the malformed optic nerve to the morning glory flower. The condition is usually unilateral.

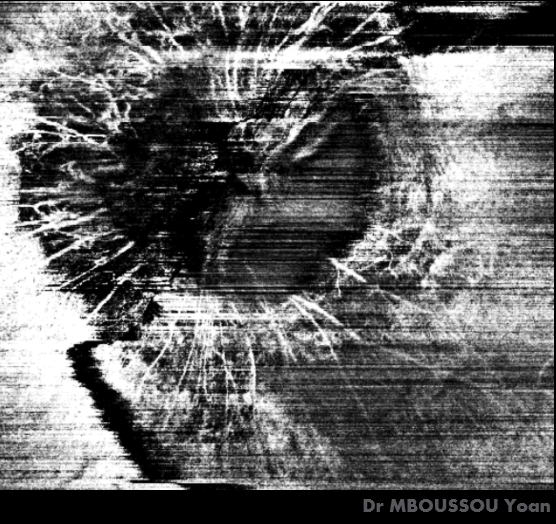
Morning glory syndrome optical coherence tomography angiography (OCTA)

== Presentation ==
=== Complications ===
Serous retinal detachment can occur in the affected eye.

=== Associated conditions ===
Although the finding itself is rare, MGDA can be associated with midline cranial defects and abnormal carotid circulation, such as carotid stenosis/aplasia or progressive vascular obstruction with collateralization (also known as moyamoya disease). The vascular defects may lead to ischemia, stroke, or seizures and so a finding of MGDA should be further investigated with radiographic imaging.

== Diagnosis ==
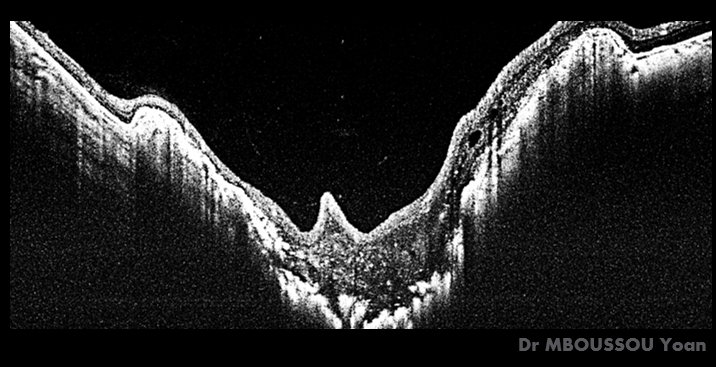
Morning glory syndrome optical coherence tomography (OCT)

On fundoscopic examination, there are three principal findings comprising the anomaly:

1. an enlarged, funnel-shaped excavation in optic disc
2. an annulus or ring of chorioretinal pigmentary changes surrounding the optic disc excavation
3. a central glial tuft overlying the optic disc

== See also ==
- Optic disc coloboma
