= Optic disc coloboma =

Defect of the optic nerve that causes visual field defects

- Other names: Disk coloboma, coloboma of the optic nerve
- Pronunciation: UK: /ˌɒp.tɪk dɪsk ˌkɑːloʊˈboʊmə/ (OP-tick disk CALL-oh-BOH-mə) US: /ˌɑːp.tɪk dɪsk kɑːləˈboʊmə/} (OP-tick disk CALL-ə-BOH-mə)
- Specialty: Ophthalmology

Optic disc coloboma is a rare defect of the optic nerve that causes moderate to severe visual field defects. It is a congenital anomaly in which there is a hole, or coloboma, in the inferior aspect of the optic disc. The issue stems from incomplete closure of the embryonic fissure while in utero. A varying amount of glial tissue typically fills the defect, manifesting as a white mass. The condition is often sporadic, meaning it is not inherited, but it can also occur as part of other conditions including CHARGE syndrome, Walker–Warburg syndrome, focal dermal hypoplasia, Aicardi syndrome, Goldenhar syndrome, and Schimmelpenning syndrome.

Historically, uncategorized optic disc anomalies have been described as colobomas, effectively turning the diagnosis into a wastebasket diagnosis. However, given the well-specified pathogenesis and presentation of coloboma, such unrecognized conditions are better described generically as dysplastic discs.

== Signs and symptoms ==
Vision in the affected eye is impaired, the degree of which depends on the size of the defect, and typically affects the visual field more than visual acuity. Additionally, there is an increased risk of serous retinal detachment. If retinal detachment does occur, it is usually not correctable and all sight is lost in the affected area of the eye, which may or may not involve the macula.

== Diagnosis ==
The first noticeable signs of the syndrome usually do not appear until after the first twelve months of the child's life. The child usually has severe balance issues as he or she learns to sit or walk, often leaning or tilting the head toward the good eye to correct the brain's skewed perception of the world. Often the child will fall in the same direction while walking or run into objects that are placed on his or her blind side. Additionally, family members may notice a white reflex in the pupil of an affected child instead of the normal red reflex when taking photographs. The presence of this phenomenon is dependent on the degree of the coloboma, with larger colobomas more likely to manifest this particular phenomenon.

This anomaly must be confirmed through pupillary dilation and examination of the optic disc, as the symptoms alone do not constitute a diagnosis.

People with optic disc colobomas live relatively normal lives. Although non-prescription glasses should be worn for eye protection, this syndrome does not usually prevent the individual from living a normal life, driving cars, playing sports, reading, etc. Certain activities, however, may be more difficult for patients with optic disc colobomas due to a compromised view of the world. Like most other eye conditions, a diagnosis of optic disc coloboma precludes a person from certain occupations.

=== Comparison with morning glory disc anomaly ===
Although both optic disc colobomas and morning glory disc anomaly (MGDA) involve mutations of the PAX6 gene, these two separate diseases represent two distinct causes. An optic disc coloboma is easily differentiated from morning glory anomaly. Colobomas affect only the inferior aspect of the nerve as it represents an incomplete closure of the embryonic fissure, whereas MGDA encompasses all aspects of the nerve and represents more generally a dysgenesis of the mesoderm.

== See also ==
- Visual field defect
- Blindness
- Cataract
