= Heidelberg Retinal Tomography =

Technology

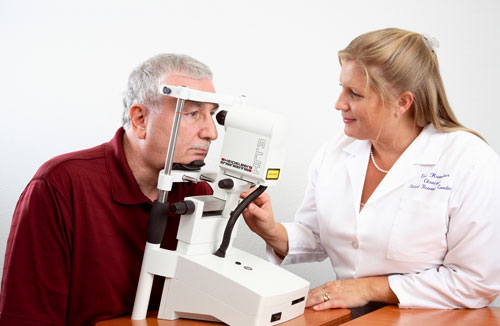
- Examination with the Heidelberg Retina Tomograph

The Heidelberg Retinal Tomography is a diagnostic procedure used in ophthalmology. The Heidelberg Retina Tomograph (HRT) is an ophthalmological confocal point scanning laser ophthalmoscope for examining the cornea and certain areas of the retina using different diagnostic modules (HRT retina, HRT cornea, HRT glaucoma). However, the most widely used area of application for HRT is the inspection of the optic nerve head (papilla) for early detection and follow-up of glaucoma. The procedure has established itself as an integral part of routine glaucoma diagnostics alongside the visual field examination (perimetry), the chamber angle examination (gonioscopy) and the measurement of intraocular pressure (tonometry). The HRT is the most widely used application of confocal scanning laser ophthalmoscopy.

== Principle ==
It is based on the principle of spot illumination and spot detection. The optic nerve and retina are illuminated through a single pinhole, and the light returning from the area of interest results in a 2D image. from a series of 2D images, a 3D image is made.

== Advantages and disadvantages ==
Its advantages include rapid image acquisition without the need for pupillary dilation, three-dimensional topographic representation of the optic nerve head, advanced data analysis capabilities built into the machine, and the ability to provide accurate data analysis over time. Also, the technology of HRT is very accurate and test-retest variability is very low. Another important advantage is that it is more comfortable for the patient as the laser only illuminates the area of interest with a low light intensity and short duration (1.6 seconds).

It is necessary to use a reference plane, drawing the contour line depends on the examiner (this is difficult in many eyes where the edge of the disc is not clearly visible), the sensitivity and accuracy decreases in large eyes with myopic changes, and the pulsation of blood vessels may cause deviations in measurements. Changes in intraocular pressure may also affect HRT measurements. These are main disadvantages of HRT.

== Glaucoma diagnosis ==
During the examination, a laser beam passes through the pupil opening onto the back of the eye and scans the optic nerve head and the retina. A three-dimensional image is generated from several tens of thousands of measuring points, which allows a quantitative assessment of all relevant anatomical structures:

- disc cup (shape, asymmetry),
- neuroretinal rim (area and volume) and
- peripapillary retinal nerve fiber layer (retinal surface height variation, thickness, asymmetry).

These stereometric parameters are compared with extensive databases and thus enable the eye to be classified taking into account the individual papillae size and the patient's age. Two independent classification methods based on different approaches are available.

== See also ==
- Fundus photography
- Fundus fluorescein angiography
- Eye examination

== Bibliography ==
- Friedrich E. Kruse, Reinhard O. Burk, Hans E. Völcker, Gerhard Zinser, Ulrich Harbarth (1989). "Reproducibility of topographic measurements of the optic nerve head with laser tomographic scanning". Ophthalmology. 96 (9): 1320–1324. doi:10.1016/S0161-6420(89)32719-9. PMID 2780001.
- Reinhard O. W. Burk, Klaus Rohrschneider, Friedrich E. Kruse, Hans E. Völcker (1990). "Glaucoma. Diagnostics and Therapy". laser scanning tomography of the papilla. Stuttgart: Enke. pp. 113–119. ISBN 3-432-98691-2.
- P. Janknecht, J. Funk (1994). "Optic nerve head analyzer and Heidelberg retina tomograph: accuracy and reproducibility of topographic measurements in a model eye and in volunteers". British Journal of Ophthalmology. 78 (10): 760–768. doi:10.1136/bjo.78.10.760. PMC 504930. PMID 7803352.
- Ville Saarela, P. Juhani Airaksinen (2008). "Heidelberg retina tomograph parameters of the optic disc in eyes with progressive retinal nerve fiber layer defects". Acta Ophthalmologica. 86 (6): 603–608. doi:10.1111/j.1600-0420.2007.01119.x. PMID 18752515.
- M. Durmus, R Karadag, M Erdurmus, Y Totan, I Feyzi Hepsen (2009). "Assessment of cup-to-disc ratio with slit-lamp funduscopy, Heidelberg Retina Tomography II, and stereoscopic photos". European Journal of Ophthalmology. 19 (1): 55–60. doi:10.1177/112067210901900108. PMID 19123149.
- Augustin, Albert J., ed. (2024). "Laser-Scanning-Tomographie (HRT)". Augenheilkunde [Ophthalmology] (in German). Kaden Verlag. p. 1196. ISBN 978-3-949313-09-7.
