= Superior segmental optic nerve hypoplasia =

Medical condition

Superior segmental optic nerve hypoplasia (SSONH), also known as topless disk syndrome or simply topless optic disc, is a congenital condition characterized by a reduced number of regional ganglion cells (RGCs) in the superior optic disc.

== History ==
In 1977, Petersen and Walton reported segmental optic nerve hypoplasia with normal visual acuity and visual field defects in seventeen children born to diabetic mothers. These findings are associated with what is now recognized as SSONH.

== Risk Factors ==
Risk factors for topless disk syndrome include being born with a low birth weight or short gestation time, being of the female sex, and being born to a diabetic mother. Maternal gestational diabetes is considered to be the strongest risk factor for SSONH, as demonstrated by multiple animal studies. Despite this, cases of SSONH without a maternal history of diabetes have been described.

== Treatment and Prognosis ==
Since SSONH is a non-progressive disease and has a generally good prognosis, treatment is rarely necessary, and studies that follow patients with SSONH display stationary visual field deficits and optical disc morphology.
