= Optic disc =

Optic nerve head, the point of exit for ganglion cell axons leaving the eye

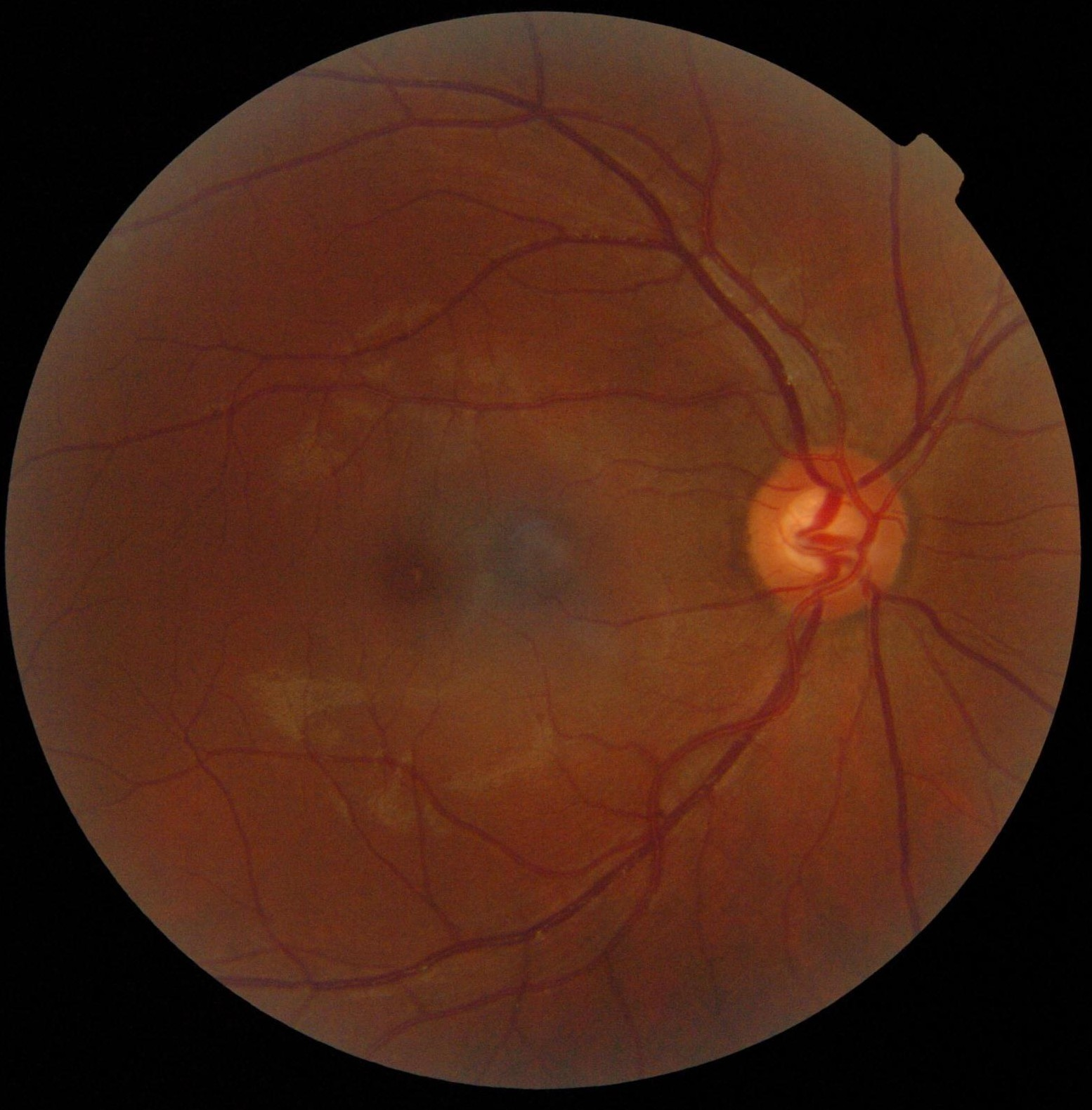
- Ophthalmoscopy photograph showing the optic disc as a bright area on the right where blood vessels converge.

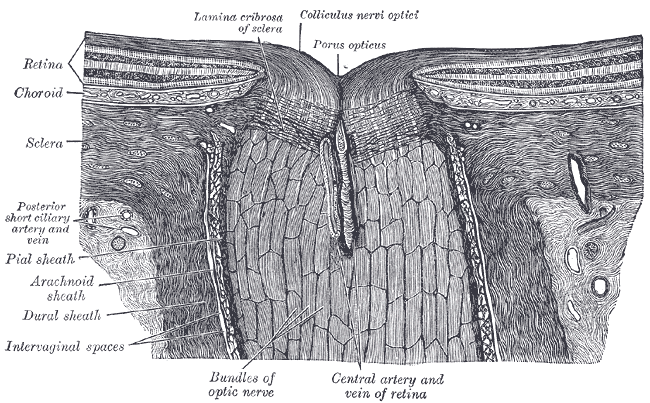
- The terminal portion of the optic nerve and its entrance into the eyeball, in horizontal section.

Details
- Synonyms: Optic disk, optic disc, optic nerve head, blind spot, Mariotte blind spot, Mariotte's blind spot, optic papilla, discus nervi optici [TA], papilla nervi optici, porus opticus)

Identifiers
- Latin: discus nervi optici
- MeSH: D009898
- TA98: A15.2.04.019
- TA2: 6788
- FMA: 58634

The optic disc or optic nerve head is the point of exit for ganglion cell axons leaving the eye. Because there are no rods or cones overlying the optic disc, it corresponds to a small blind spot in each eye.

The ganglion cell axons form the optic nerve after they leave the eye. The optic disc represents the beginning of the optic nerve and is the point where the axons of retinal ganglion cells come together. The optic disc in a normal human eye carries 1–1.2 million afferent nerve fibers from the eye toward the brain. The optic disc is also the entry point for the major arteries that supply the retina with blood, and the exit point for the veins from the retina.

== Structure ==
The optic disc is located 3 to 4 mm to the nasal side of the fovea. It is a vertical oval, with average dimensions of 1.76mm horizontally by 1.92mm vertically. There is a central depression, of variable size, called the optic cup. This depression can be a variety of shapes from a shallow indentation to a bean pot—this shape can be significant for diagnosis of some retinal diseases.

== Function ==
The optic disc or optic nerve head is the point of exit for ganglion cell axons leaving the eye. Because there are no rods or cones overlying the optic disc, it corresponds to a small blind spot in each eye.

== Clinical significance ==
Almost all eye structures can be examined with appropriate optical equipment and lenses. Using a modern direct ophthalmoscope gives a view of the optic disc using the principle of reversibility of light. A slit lamp biomicroscopic examination along with an appropriate aspheric focusing lens (+66D, +78D or +90D) is required for a detailed stereoscopic view of the optic disc and structures inside the eye.

A biomicroscopic exam can indicate the health of the optic nerve. In particular, the eye care physician notes the colour, cupping size (as a cup-to-disc ratio), sharpness of edge, swelling, hemorrhages, notching in the optic disc and any other unusual anomalies. It is useful for finding evidence corroborating the diagnosis of glaucoma and other optic neuropathies, optic neuritis, anterior ischemic optic neuropathy or papilledema (i.e. optic disc swelling produced by raised intracranial pressure), and optic disc drusen.

Women in an advanced stage of pregnancy with pre-eclampsia should be screened by an ophthalmoscopic examination of the optic disc for early evidence of a rise in intracranial pressure.

=== Pale disc ===
Schematic diagram of the human eye, with the optic disc, or blind spot, at the lower left. Shown is a horizontal cross section of the right eye, viewed from above.

A normal optic disc is orange to pink in colour . A pale disc is an optic disc which varies in colour from a pale pink or orange colour to white. A pale disc is an indication of a disease condition.

=== Imaging ===
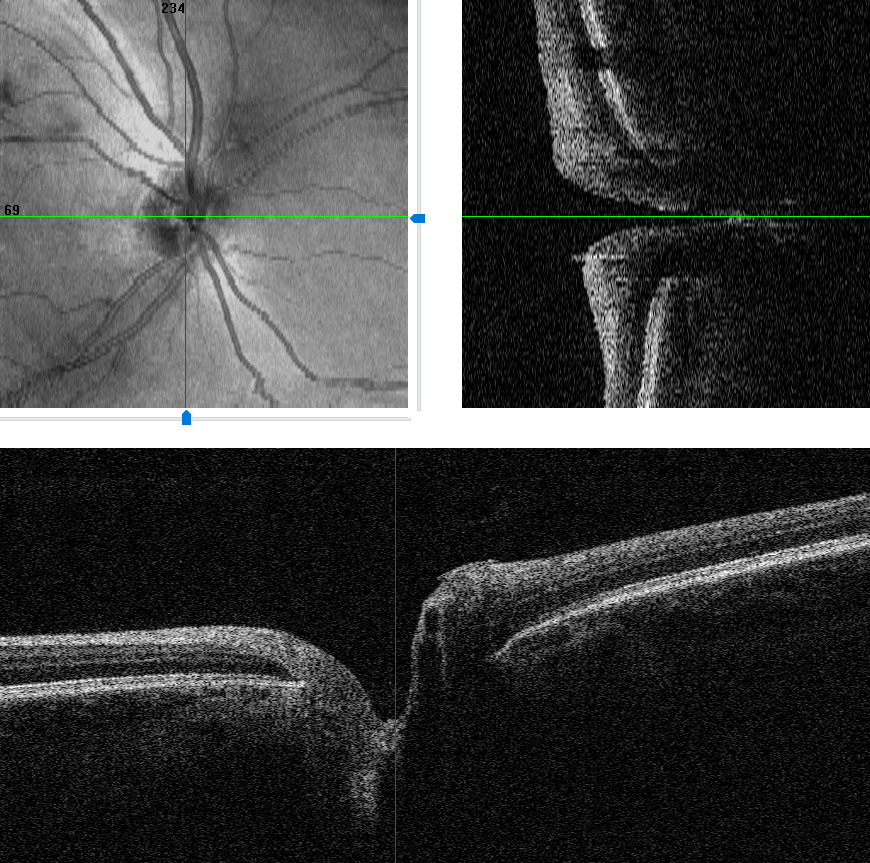
Optic disc cross-sections imaged by an SD-OCT.

Traditional colour-film camera images are the reference standard in imaging, requiring an ophthalmic photographer, ophthalmic technician, optometrist or ophthalmologist for taking standardised pictures of the optic disc. Stereoscopic images offer an investigative tool for serial follow-up of suspected changes in the hands of an optometrist or ophthalmologist.

Automated techniques have also been developed to allow for more efficient and less expensive imaging. Heidelberg retinal tomography (HRT), scanning laser polarimetry and optical coherence tomography are computerised techniques for imaging various structures of the eyes, including the optic disc. They quantify the nerve fiber layer of the disc and surrounding retina and statistically correlate the findings with a database of previously screened population of normals. They are useful for baseline and serial follow-up to monitor minute changes in optic disc morphology. Imaging will not provide conclusive evidence for clinical diagnosis however, and the evidence needs to be supplanted by serial physiological testing for functional changes. Such tests may include visual field charting and final clinical interpretation of the complete eye examination by an eye care physician. Ophthalmologists and optometrists are able to provide this service.

Blood flow in the retina and choroid in the optic disc region can be revealed non invasively by near-infrared laser Doppler imaging. Laser Doppler imaging can enable mapping of the local arterial resistivity index, and the possibility to perform unambiguous identification of retinal arteries and veins on the basis of their systole-diastole variations, and reveal ocular hemodynamics in human eyes. Furthermore, the Doppler spectrum asymmetry reveals the local direction of blood flow with respect to the optical axis. This directional information is overlaid on standard grayscale blood flow images to depict flow in the central artery and vein.

A systematic review of 106 studies and 16,260 eyes compared the performance of the imaging techniques, and found that all three imaging tests performed very similarly when detecting for glaucoma. The review found that in 1,000 patients subjected to imaging tests, with 200 having manifest glaucoma, the best imaging tests would miss 60 cases out of the 200 patients with glaucoma, and incorrectly refer 50 out of 800 patients without glaucoma.

== Abnormalities ==
- Megalopapilla: a non-progressive condition in which the optic disc is enlarged (diameter exceeding 2.1 mm) with no other morphological abnormalities.
- Morning glory disc anomaly: a unilateral congenital deformity resulting from failure of the optic nerve to completely form in utero. The term was coined in 1970 by Kindler, noting a resemblance of the malformed optic nerve to the morning glory flower.
- Optic disc coloboma: a congenital deformity resulting from improper closure of the choroid fissure, usually bilateral.
- Optic pit: congenital excavation of the optic disc resulting from a malformation during development of the eye.
- Superior segmental optic nerve hypoplasia: a congenital optic-disc anomaly involving hypoplasia of the superior portion of the optic nerve head, often accompanied by superior retinal nerve-fiber-layer thinning and an inferior visual-field defect.

== Gallery ==
Blood flow in the optic disc revealed by holographic laser Doppler imaging.

Local direction of blood flow with respect to the optical axis revealed by the Doppler spectrum asymmetry in out-of-plane retinal vessels by holographic laser Doppler imaging.

Three dimensional image of a healthy optic disc in a 24-year-old female.

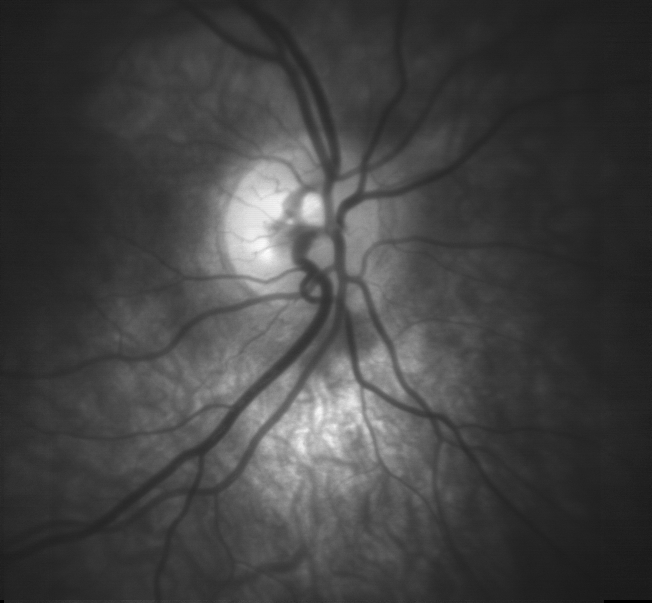
Optic disc showing microvasculature.

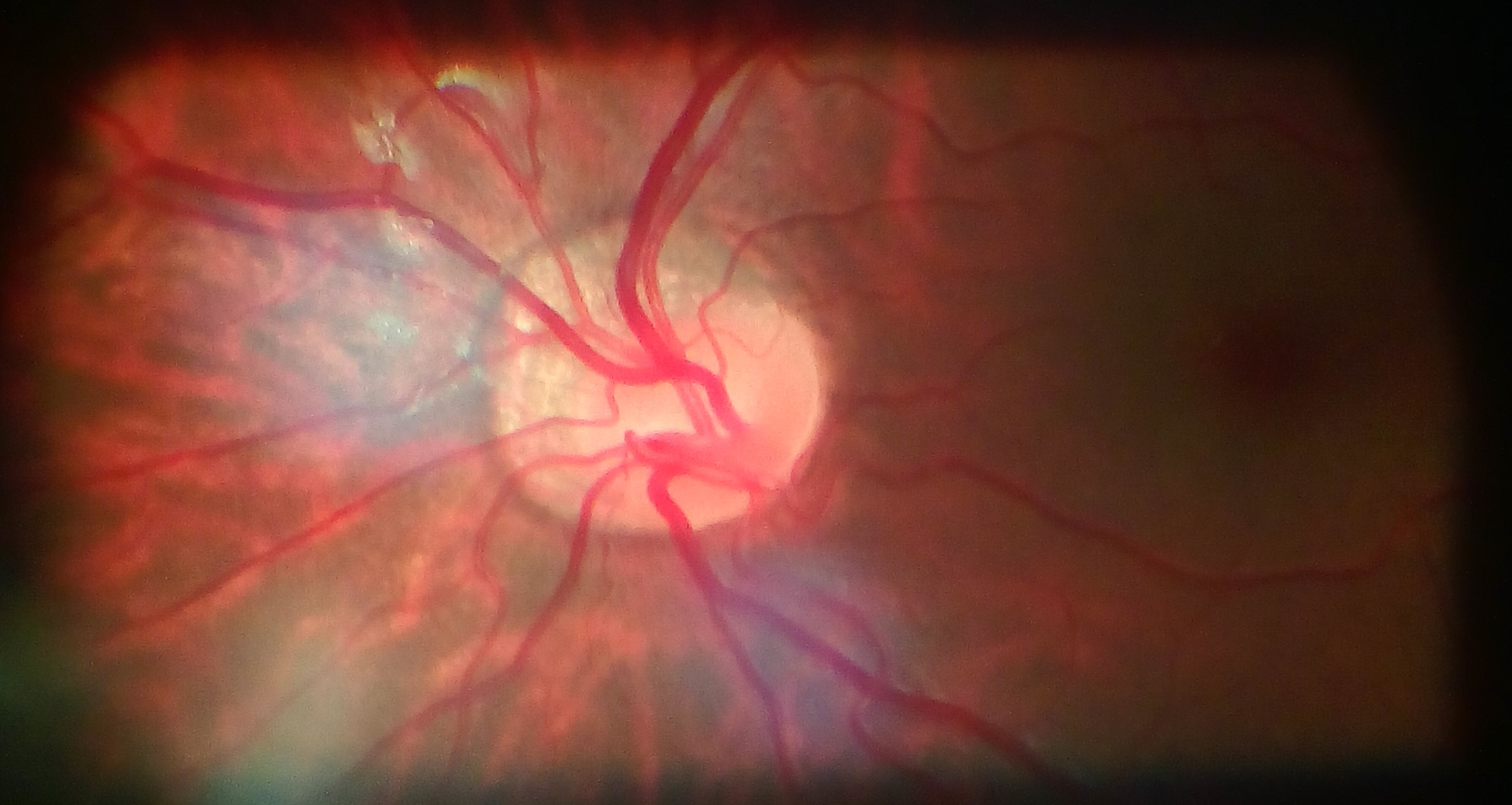
Tilted optic disc in left eye of a 20-year-old male.

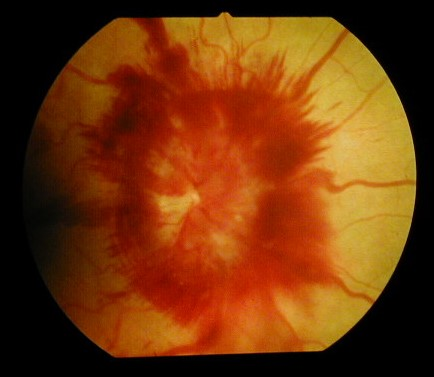
Optic disc edema and haemorrhage

== Comparative anatomy ==
The optic disc has different shapes among vertebrates. It may be circular, oval, reniform, triangular, or linear. The linear form is the case for the squirrels, most birds, and the predaceous pikes, salmonoids, and percoids among the teleost fishes.

Most squirrels have a very long and thin linear optic disc, placed horizontally and dorsally in the retina. This allows the squirrel to see the sky without blind spots. Generally, the brighter the environment that the squirrel is active in, the longer the optic disc. The flying squirrel Glaucomys volans is nocturnal, and has a circular optic disc at the center of the fundus.

== See also ==
- Optic disc pallor
