= Carboxypeptidase X, M14 family member 2 =

Protein-coding gene in the species Homo sapiens

CPXM2

Identifiers
- Aliases: CPXM2, CPX2, UNQ676, carboxypeptidase X (M14 family), member 2, carboxypeptidase X, M14 family member 2
- External IDs: OMIM: 617348; MGI: 1926006; GeneCards: CPXM2

Gene location (Human)
Chr.	Chromosome 10 (human)
Band	10q26.13	Start	123,706,207 bp
Band	10q26.13	End	123,940,267 bp

Gene location (Mouse)
Chr.	Chromosome 7 (mouse)
Band	7|7 F3	Start	131,634,416 bp
Band	7|7 F3	End	131,756,468 bp
RNA expression pattern
Bgee	Human / Mouse (ortholog); Top expressed in: right coronary artery; ascending aorta; Descending thoracic aorta; saphenous vein; vena cava; pericardium; trigeminal ganglion; left coronary artery; urethra; trachea / Top expressed in: vestibular sensory epithelium; corneal stroma; retinal pigment epithelium; interventricular septum; utricle; myocardium of ventricle; esophagus; calvaria; iris; stria vascularis; More reference expression data
BioGPS	n/a
Gene ontology
Molecular function	zinc ion binding; metallocarboxypeptidase activity; serine-type carboxypeptidase activity
Cellular component	extracellular region; extracellular space
Biological process	protein processing; peptide metabolic process; proteolysis
Sources:Amigo / QuickGO
Orthologs
Databases	NCBI: entry; OMA: entry
Species	Human	Mouse
Entrez	119587	55987
Ensembl	ENSG00000121898	ENSMUSG00000030862
UniProt	Q8N436	Q9D2L5
RefSeq (mRNA)	NM_198148	NM_018867
RefSeq (protein)	NP_937791	NP_061355
Location (UCSC)	Chr 10: 123.71 – 123.94 Mb	Chr 7: 131.63 – 131.76 Mb
PubMed search
- Wikidata
View/Edit Human	View/Edit Mouse

Carboxypeptidase X, M14 family member 2 is a protein that in humans is encoded by the CPXM2 gene.
