= Discoidin domain-containing receptor 2 =

Protein found in humans

DDR2
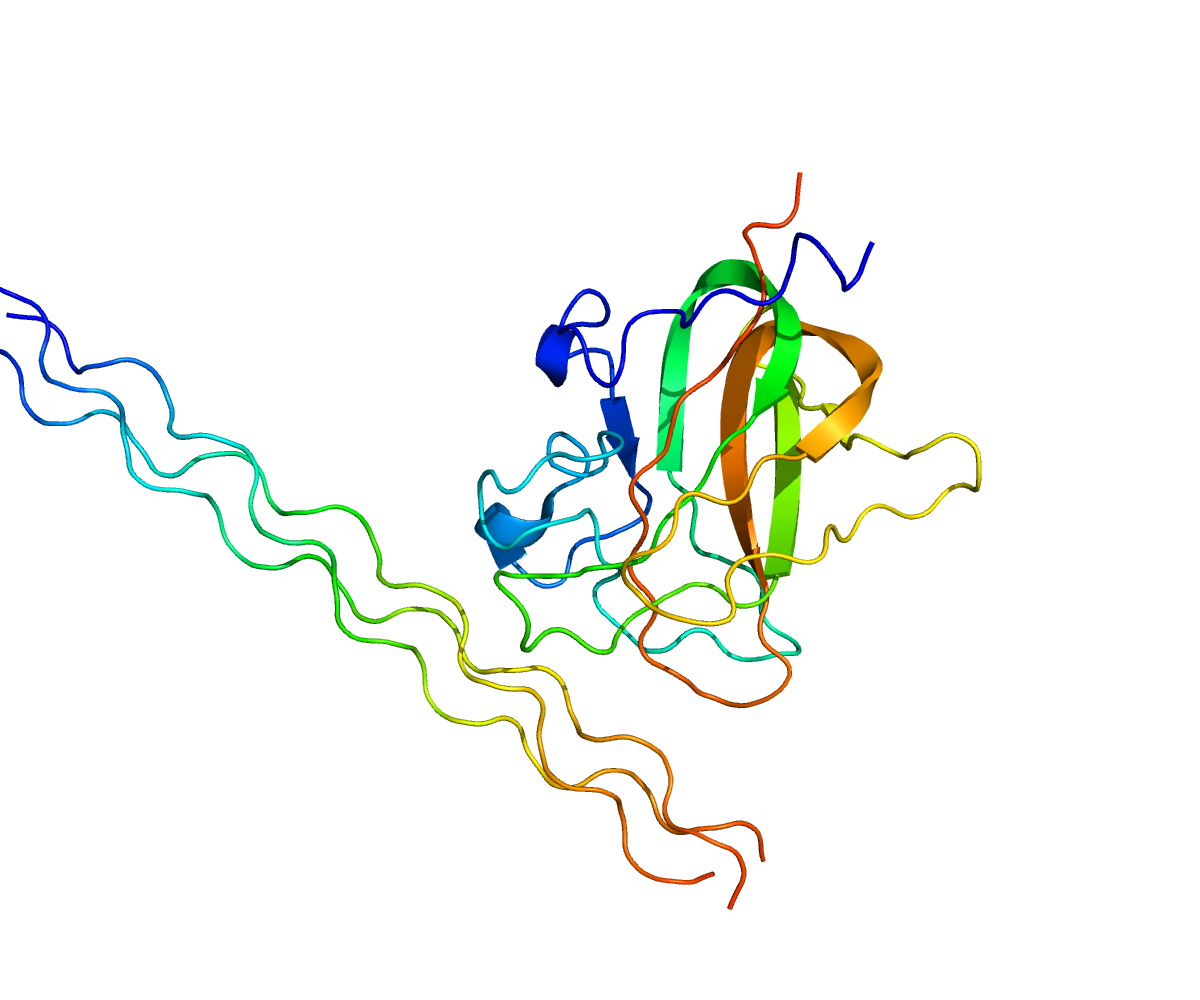

Identifiers
- Aliases: DDR2, MIG20a, NTRKR3, TKT, TYRO10, discoidin domain receptor tyrosine kinase 2, WRCN
- External IDs: OMIM: 191311; MGI: 1345277; GeneCards: DDR2
Available structures
PDB	Ortholog search: PDBe RCSB
PDB	List of PDB id codes 2WUH, 2Z4F
Enzyme activity
EC #	BRENDA	ExPASy	KEGG	MetaCyc
2.7.10.1	↗	↗	↗	↗

Gene location (Human)
Chr.	Chromosome 1 (human)
Band	1q23.3	Start	162,631,373 bp
Band	1q23.3	End	162,787,405 bp

Gene location (Mouse)
Chr.	Chromosome 1 (mouse)
Band	1 H3|1 76.84 cM	Start	169,799,876 bp
Band	1 H3|1 76.84 cM	End	169,938,331 bp
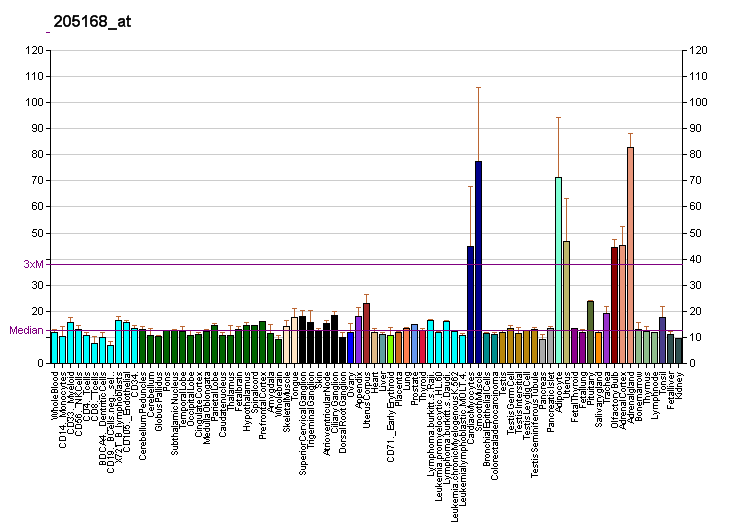
RNA expression pattern
Bgee	Human / Mouse (ortholog); Top expressed in: tail of epididymis; tendon of biceps brachii; vena cava; synovial joint; Achilles tendon; caput epididymis; cartilage tissue; tibia; buccal mucosa cell; pericardium / Top expressed in: calvaria; ascending aorta; dermis; lumbar spinal ganglion; aortic valve; body of femur; fossa; ankle; iris; stroma of bone marrow; More reference expression data
BioGPS	More reference expression data
Gene ontology
Molecular function	transferase activity; nucleotide binding; protein kinase activity; kinase activity; protein binding; transmembrane receptor protein tyrosine kinase activity; protein tyrosine kinase collagen receptor activity; protein tyrosine kinase activity; ATP binding; collagen binding
Cellular component	integral component of membrane; membrane; focal adhesion; integral component of plasma membrane; extracellular exosome; apical plasma membrane; plasma membrane; actin cytoskeleton; receptor complex
Biological process	collagen-activated tyrosine kinase receptor signaling pathway; ossification; phosphorylation; collagen fibril organization; transmembrane receptor protein tyrosine kinase signaling pathway; regulation of bone mineralization; positive regulation of fibroblast proliferation; biomineral tissue development; positive regulation of DNA-binding transcription factor activity; extracellular matrix organization; regulation of extracellular matrix disassembly; positive regulation of extracellular matrix disassembly; protein phosphorylation; cell adhesion; positive regulation of osteoblast differentiation; chondrocyte proliferation; positive regulation of cell population proliferation; peptidyl-tyrosine phosphorylation; endochondral bone growth; positive regulation of fibroblast migration; signal transduction; positive regulation of protein kinase activity; protein autophosphorylation; regulation of cell-matrix adhesion; cell-matrix adhesion; cell differentiation; regulation of extracellular matrix organization
Sources:Amigo / QuickGO
Orthologs
Databases	NCBI: entry; OMA: entry
Species	Human	Mouse
Entrez	4921	18214
Ensembl	ENSG00000162733	ENSMUSG00000026674
UniProt	Q16832	Q62371
RefSeq (mRNA)	NM_001014796; NM_006182; NM_001354982; NM_001354983	NM_022563
RefSeq (protein)	NP_001014796; NP_006173; NP_001341911; NP_001341912	NP_072075
Location (UCSC)	Chr 1: 162.63 – 162.79 Mb	Chr 1: 169.8 – 169.94 Mb
PubMed search
- Wikidata
View/Edit Human	View/Edit Mouse

Discoidin domain-containing receptor 2, also known as CD167b (cluster of differentiation 167b), is a protein that in humans is encoded by the DDR2 gene. Discoidin domain-containing receptor 2 is a receptor tyrosine kinase (RTK).

== Function ==
RTKs play a key role in the communication of cells with their microenvironment. These molecules are involved in the regulation of cell growth, differentiation, and metabolism. In several cases the biochemical mechanism by which RTKs transduce signals across the membrane has been shown to be ligand induced receptor oligomerization and subsequent intracellular phosphorylation. In the case of DDR2, the ligand is collagen which binds to its extracellular discoidin domain. This autophosphorylation leads to phosphorylation of cytosolic targets as well as association with other molecules, which are involved in pleiotropic effects of signal transduction. DDR2 has been associated with a number of diseases including fibrosis and cancer.

== Structure ==
RTKs have a tripartite structure with extracellular, transmembrane, and cytoplasmic regions. This gene encodes a member of a novel subclass of RTKs and contains a distinct extracellular region encompassing a factor VIII–like domain.

== Gene ==
Alternative splicing in the 5' UTR of the DDR2 gene results in multiple transcript variants encoding the same protein.

== Interactions ==
DDR2 (gene) has been shown to interact with SHC1 and phosphorylate Shp2. DDR2 also interacts with Integrin α_{1}β_{1} and α_{2}β_{1} by promoting their adhesion to collagen.
