= Optic cup (anatomical) =

Area of the optic disc

- Wiggle stereogram showing the optic cup in a healthy eye

Details

Identifiers
- Latin: excavatio disci
- TA98: A15.2.04.020
- TA2: 6789
- FMA: 77664

The optic cup is the white, cup-like area in the center of the optic disc.

The ratio of the size of the optic cup to the optic disc (cup-to-disc ratio, or C/D) is one measure used in the diagnosis of glaucoma. Different C/Ds can be measured horizontally or vertically in the same patient. C/Ds vary widely in healthy individuals. However, larger vertical C/Ds, or C/Ds which are very different between the eyes, may raise suspicion of glaucoma. A C/D which enlarges vertically over months or years suggests glaucoma.

== Cup-to-disc ratio ==
Cup-to-disc ratio
- LOINC: 71484-0, 71485-7

The cup-to-disc ratio (often notated CDR) is a measurement used in ophthalmology and optometry to assess the progression of glaucoma. The optic disc is the anatomical location of the eye's "blind spot", the area where the optic nerve leave and blood vessels enter the retina. The optic disc can be flat or it can have a certain amount of normal cupping. But glaucoma, which is in most cases associated with an increase in intraocular pressure, often produces additional pathological cupping of the optic disc. The pink rim of disc contains nerve fibers. The white cup is a pit with no nerve fibers. As glaucoma advances, the cup enlarges until it occupies most of the disc area.

The cup-to-disc ratio compares the diameter of the cup portion of the optic disc with the total diameter of the optic disc. A good analogy to better understand the cup-to-disc ratio is the ratio of a donut hole to a donut. The hole represents the cup and the surrounding area the disc. If the cup fills 1/10 of the disc, the ratio will be 0.1. If it fills 7/10 of the disc, the ratio is 0.7. The normal cup-to-disc ratio is less than 0.5. A large cup-to-disc ratio may imply glaucoma or other pathology. However, cupping by itself is not indicative of glaucoma. Rather, it is an increase in cupping as the patient ages that is an indicator for glaucoma. Deep but stable cupping can occur due to hereditary factors without glaucoma.
