= Takayasu's arteritis =

- Other names: Takayasu arteritis, Nonspecific aortoarteritis, Takayasu's disease
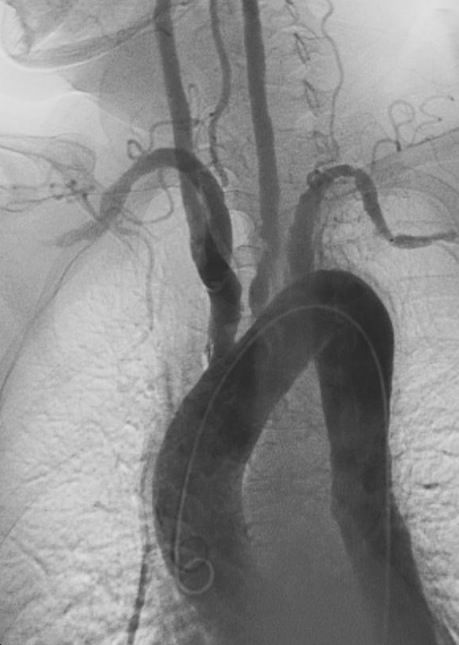
- Left anterior oblique angiographic image of Takayasu's arteritis showing areas of stenosis in multiple great vessels
- Specialty: Immunology, rheumatology
- Frequency: 0.005%

Takayasu's arteritis (TA), also known as aortic arch syndrome, nonspecific aortoarteritis, and pulseless disease, is a form of large vessel granulomatous vasculitis with massive intimal fibrosis and vascular narrowing, most commonly affecting young or middle-aged women of Asian descent, though anyone can be affected. It mainly affects the aorta (the main blood vessel leaving the heart) and its branches, as well as the pulmonary arteries. Females are about 8–9 times more likely to be affected than males.

Those with the disease often notice symptoms between 15 and 30 years of age. In the Western world, atherosclerosis is a more frequent cause of obstruction of the aortic arch vessels than Takayasu's arteritis. Takayasu's arteritis is similar to other forms of vasculitis, including giant cell arteritis, which typically affects older individuals. Due to obstruction of the main branches of the aorta, including the left common carotid artery, the brachiocephalic artery, and the left subclavian artery, Takayasu's arteritis can present as pulseless upper extremities (arms, hands, and wrists with weak or absent pulses on the physical examination) which may be why it is also commonly referred to as the "pulseless disease." Involvement of renal arteries may lead to a presentation of renovascular hypertension.

== Sign and symptoms ==
Some people develop an initial "inflammatory phase" characterized by systemic illness with signs and symptoms of malaise, fever, night sweats, weight loss, joint pain, fatigue, and fainting. Fainting may result from subclavian steal syndrome or carotid sinus hypersensitivity. There is also often anemia and marked elevation of the ESR or C-reactive protein (nonspecific markers of inflammation). The initial "inflammatory phase" is often followed by a secondary "pulseless phase". The "pulseless phase" is characterized by vascular insufficiency from intimal narrowing of the vessels manifesting as arm or leg claudication, renal artery stenosis causing hypertension, and neurological manifestations due to decreased blood flow to the brain.

Of note is the function of renal artery stenosis in the causation of high blood pressure: Normally perfused kidneys produce a proportionate amount of a substance called renin. Stenosis of the renal arteries causes hypoperfusion (decreased blood flow) of the juxtaglomerular apparatus, resulting in exaggerated renin secretion and high blood levels of aldosterone, eventually leading to water and salt retention and high blood pressure. The neurological symptoms of the disease vary depending on the degree, the nature of the blood vessel obstruction, and can range from lightheadedness to seizures (in severe cases).

One rare, important feature of Takayasu's arteritis is ocular involvement manifesting as visual field defects, vision loss, or retinal hemorrhage. Some individuals with Takayasu's arteritis may present with only late vascular changes, without a preceding systemic illness. In the late stages, weakness of the arterial walls may lead to localized aneurysms. As with all aneurysms, the possibility of rupture and vascular bleeding exists and requires monitoring. In view of the chronic process and good collateral development, Raynaud's phenomenon or digital gangrene are very rare in Takayasu arteritis.

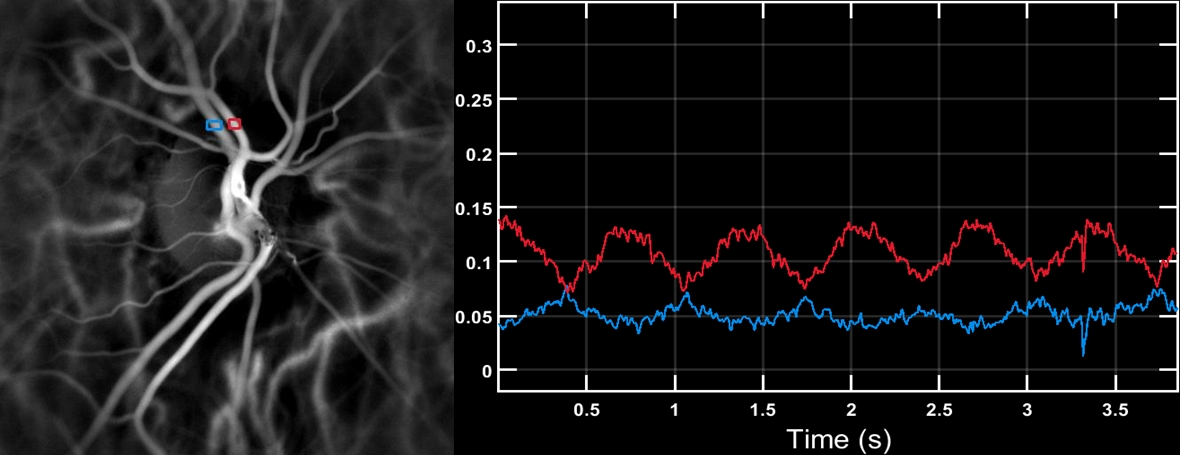
Blood flow pulse wave in the central retinal artery (red) and vein (blue), measured in the eye fundus of a patient with Takayasu arteritis by laser Doppler imaging.

Laser Doppler imaging by near-infrared digital holography can reveal characteristic blood flow waveforms in the central artery and vein of the retina in patients with vascular insufficiency who may exhibit a smooth systo-diastolic pulse in the central retinal artery. This technique enables non-invasive functional microangiography by high-contrast measurement of endoluminal bloodflow profiles in vessels in the posterior segment of the eye with spatial resolution comparable to state-of-the-art indocyanine green angiography.

== Causes ==
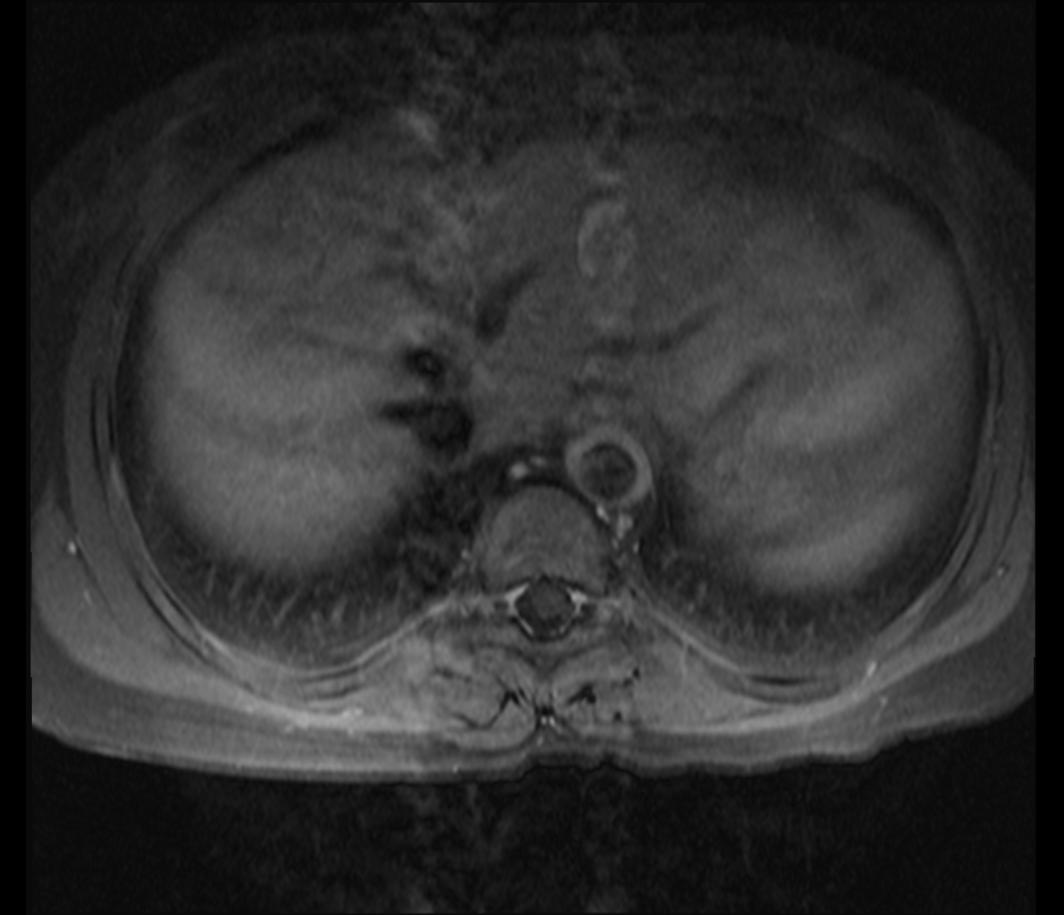
Axial T1-weighted post-gadolinium MRI in a patient with Takayasu arteritis showing thickened, enhancing aortic wall, consistent with large vessel vasculitis

Although the cause of Takayasu arteritis is unknown, the condition is characterized by segmental and patchy granulomatous inflammation of the aorta and its major derivative branches. This inflammation leads to arterial stenosis, thrombosis, and aneurysms. There is irregular fibrosis of the blood vessels due to chronic vasculitis, leading to sometimes massive intimal fibrosis (fibrosis of the inner section of the blood vessels). Prominent narrowing due to inflammation, granuloma, and fibrosis is often seen in arterial studies such as magnetic resonance angiography (MRA), computed tomography angiography (CTA), and arterial angiography (DSA).

=== Genetics ===
The genetic association with HLA-B∗52 supports the genetic contribution to the pathogenesis of Takayasu's arteritis. A 2013 large collaborative study found multiple additional susceptibility loci for this disease, increasing the number of genetic loci to five risk loci across the genome. About 200,000 genetic variants were genotyped in two ethnically divergent Takayasu's arteritis cohorts from Turkey and North America by using a custom-designed genotyping platform (Immunochip). Additional genetic variants and the classical HLA alleles were imputed and analyzed. The study identified and confirmed two independent susceptibility loci within the HLA region (r2 < 0.2): HLA-B/MICA (rs12524487, OR = 3.29, p = 5.57 × 10-16) and HLA-DQB1/HLA-DRB1 (rs113452171, OR = 2.34, p = 3.74 × 10-9; and rs189754752, OR = 2.47, p = 4.22 × 10-9). In addition, a genetic association was identified and confirmed between Takayasu's arteritis and the FCGR2A/FCGR3A locus on chromosome 1 (rs10919543, OR = 1.81, p = 5.89 × 10-12). The risk allele at this locus results in increased mRNA expression of FCGR2A. In addition, a genetic association between IL12B and Takayasu arteritis was established (rs56167332, OR = 1.54, p = 2.18 × 10-8). A fifth genetic locus for the disease in an intergenic region on chromosome 21q22 downstream of PSMG1 was revealed (P=4.39X10-7). A recent genome-wide association study (GWAS) identified genetic susceptibility loci for Takayasu arteritis with a genome-wide level of significance in IL6 (rs2069837) (odds ratio [OR] 2.07, P = 6.70 × 10(-9)), RPS9/LILRB3 (rs11666543) (OR 1.65, P = 2.34 × 10(-8)), and the intergenic locus on chromosome 21q22 (rs2836878) (OR 1.79, P = 3.62 × 10(-10)). The genetic susceptibility locus in RPS9/LILRB3 lies within the leukocyte receptor complex gene cluster on chromosome 19q13.4, and the disease risk variant in this locus correlates with reduced expression of multiple genes, including the inhibitory leukocyte immunoglobulin-like receptor gene LILRB3 (P = 2.29 × 10(-8)). In addition, this study identified additional candidate susceptibility genes with suggestive levels of association (P < 1 × 10(-5)) including PCSK5, LILRA3, PPM1G/NRBP1, and PTK2B.

Another gene associated with this condition is MLX (Max-like protein X)

== Diagnosis ==
Diagnosis is based on the demonstration of vascular lesions in large and middle-sized vessels on angiography, CT scan, magnetic resonance angiography or FDG PET. Seeing abnormal diffuse arterial wall thickening, the 'macaroni sign', with ultrasound is highly suggestive of the condition. FDG PET can help in diagnosis of active inflammation not just in patients with active Takayasu arteritis before treatment but also in addition in relapsing patients receiving immunosuppressive agents.

Contrast angiography has been the gold standard. The earliest detectable lesion is a local narrowing or irregularity of the lumen. This may develop into stenosis and occlusion. The characteristic finding is the presence of "skip lesions," where stenosis or aneurysms alternate with normal vessels. Angiography provides information on vessel anatomy and patency, but does not provide information on the degree of inflammation in the wall.

The age at onset helps to differentiate Takayasu's arteritis from other large-vessel vasculitides. For example, Takaysu's arteritis has an age of onset of <40 years, while giant cell arteritis has an age of onset >60 years.

Takayasu arteritis is not associated with ANCA, rheumatoid factor, ANA, and anticardiolipin antibodies.

== Treatments ==
Most people with Takayasu's arteritis respond to steroids such as prednisone. The usual starting dose is approximately 1 milligram per kilogram of body weight per day (for most people, this is approximately 60 milligrams a day). Because of the significant side effects of long-term high-dose prednisone use, the starting dose is tapered over several weeks to a dose that controls symptoms while limiting the side effects of steroids.

Promising results are achieved with mycophenolate and tocilizumab. If treatment is not kept to a high standard, long-term damage or death can occur.

Patients who do not respond to steroids may require revascularization, either via vascular bypass or angioplasty and stenting. Outcomes following revascularization vary depending on the severity of the underlying disease.

== History ==
The first case of Takayasu's arteritis was described in 1908 by Japanese ophthalmologist Mikito Takayasu at the Annual Meeting of the Japan Ophthalmology Society. Takayasu described a peculiar "wreathlike" appearance of the blood vessels in the back of the eye (retina). Two Japanese physicians at the same meeting (Drs. Onishi and Kagoshima) reported similar eye findings in individuals whose wrist pulses were absent.

It is now known that the blood vessel malformations that occur in the retina are an angiogenic response to the arterial narrowings in the neck and that the absence of pulses noted in some people occurs because of narrowings of the blood vessels to the arms. The eye findings described by Takayasu are rarely seen in patients from North America and British Columbia.
