= Hemodynamics =

Dynamics of blood flow

Hemodynamics or haemodynamics are the dynamics of blood flow as well as a branch of biofluid dynamics. The circulatory system is controlled by homeostatic mechanisms of autoregulation, just as hydraulic circuits are controlled by control systems. The hemodynamic response continuously monitors and adjusts to conditions in the body and its environment. Hemodynamics explains the physical laws that govern the flow of blood in the blood vessels.

Blood flow ensures the transportation of nutrients, hormones, metabolic waste products, oxygen, and carbon dioxide throughout the body to maintain cell-level metabolism, the regulation of the pH, osmotic pressure and temperature of the whole body, and the protection from microbial and mechanical harm.

Blood can behave as a non-Newtonian fluid, and is most commonly studied using rheology. Because blood vessels are not rigid tubes; classic hydrodynamics based on the use of classical viscometers are incapable of explaining haemodynamics.

The study of the blood flow is called hemodynamics, whilst the study of the properties of the blood flow is called hemorheology.

== Blood ==
Blood is a complex liquid. Blood is composed of plasma and formed elements. The plasma contains 91.5% water, 7% proteins and 1.5% other solutes. The formed elements are platelets, white blood cells, and red blood cells. The presence of these formed elements and their interaction with plasma molecules are the main reasons why blood differs so much from ideal Newtonian fluids.

=== Viscosity of plasma ===
Normal blood plasma behaves like a solid suspended in fluid and blood is modelled as a Newtonian fluid at normal physiological flow rates. Typical values for the viscosity of normal human plasma at 37 °C is 1.4 mN·s/m^{2}. The viscosity of normal plasma varies with temperature in the same way as does that of its solvent water; a 3 °C change in temperature in the physiological range (36.5 °C to 39.5 °C) reduces plasma viscosity by about 10%.

=== Osmotic pressure of plasma ===
The osmotic pressure of solution is determined by the number of particles present and by the temperature. For example, a 1 molar solution of a substance contains 6.022×10^{23} molecules per gram of that substance and at 0 °C it has an osmotic pressure of 2.27 MPa (22.4 atm). The osmotic pressure of the plasma affects the mechanics of the circulation in several ways. An alteration of the osmotic pressure difference across the membrane of a blood cell causes a shift of water and a change of cell volume. The changes in shape and flexibility affect the mechanical properties of whole blood. A change in plasma osmotic pressure alters the hematocrit, that is, the volume concentration of red cells in the whole blood by redistributing water between the intravascular and extravascular spaces. This in turn affects the mechanics of the whole blood.

=== Red blood cells ===
The red blood cell is highly flexible and biconcave in shape. Its membrane has a Young's modulus in the region of 106 Pa. Deformation in red blood cells is induced by shear stress. When a suspension is sheared, the red blood cells deform and spin because of the velocity gradient, with the rate of deformation and spin depending on the shear rate and the concentration. This can influence the mechanics of the circulation and may complicate the measurement of blood viscosity. It is true that in a steady state flow of a viscous fluid through a rigid spherical body immersed in the fluid, where we assume the inertia is negligible in such a flow, it is believed that the downward gravitational force of the particle is balanced by the viscous drag force. From this force balance the speed of fall can be shown to be given by Stokes' law

$U_s = \frac{2}{9}\frac{\left(\rho_p - \rho_f\right)}{\mu} g\, a^2$

Where a is the particle radius, ρ_{p}, ρ_{f} are the respectively particle and fluid density μ is the fluid viscosity, g is the gravitational acceleration. From the above equation we can see that the sedimentation velocity of the particle depends on the square of the radius. If the particle is released from rest in the fluid, its sedimentation velocity U_{s} increases until it attains the steady value called the terminal velocity (U), as shown above.

=== Hemodilution ===
Hemodilution is the dilution of the concentration of red blood cells and plasma constituents by partially substituting the blood with colloids or crystalloids. It is a strategy to avoid exposure of patients to the potential hazards of homologous blood transfusions.

Hemodilution can be normovolemic, which implies the dilution of normal blood constituents by the use of expanders. During acute normovolemic hemodilution (ANH), blood subsequently lost during surgery contains proportionally fewer red blood cells per milliliter, thus minimizing intraoperative loss of the whole blood. Therefore, blood lost by the patient during surgery is not actually lost by the patient, for this volume is purified and redirected into the patient.

On the other hand, hypervolemic hemodilution (HVH) uses acute preoperative volume expansion without any blood removal. In choosing a fluid, however, it must be assured that when mixed, the remaining blood behaves in the microcirculation as in the original blood fluid, retaining all its properties of viscosity.

In presenting what volume of ANH should be applied one study suggests a mathematical model of ANH which calculates the maximum possible RCM savings using ANH, given the patients weight H_{i} and H_{m}.

To maintain the normovolemia, the withdrawal of autologous blood must be simultaneously replaced by a suitable hemodilute. Ideally, this is achieved by isovolemia exchange transfusion of a plasma substitute with a colloid osmotic pressure (OP). A colloid is a fluid containing particles that are large enough to exert an oncotic pressure across the micro-vascular membrane. When debating the use of colloid or crystalloid, it is imperative to think about all the components of the starling equation:

$$\ Q = K ( [P_c - P_i]S - [P_c - P_i] )$$

To identify the minimum safe hematocrit desirable for a given patient the following equation is useful:

$$\ BL_s = EBV \ln \frac{H_i}{H_m}$$

where EBV is the estimated blood volume; 70 mL/kg was used in this model and H_{i} (initial hematocrit) is the patient's initial hematocrit. From the equation above it is clear that the volume of blood removed during the ANH to the H_{m} is the same as the BL_{s}. How much blood is to be removed is usually based on the weight, not the volume. The number of units that need to be removed to hemodilute to the maximum safe hematocrit (ANH) can be found by

$$ANH = \frac {BL_s}{450}$$

This is based on the assumption that each unit removed by hemodilution has a volume of 450 mL (the actual volume of a unit will vary somewhat since completion of collection is dependent on weight and not volume). The model assumes that the hemodilute value is equal to the H_{m} prior to surgery, therefore, the re-transfusion of blood obtained by hemodilution must begin when SBL begins. The RCM available for retransfusion after ANH (RCMm) can be calculated from the patient's H_{i} and the final hematocrit after hemodilution(H_{m})

$$RCM = EVB \times (H_i - H_m)$$

The maximum SBL that is possible when ANH is used without falling below Hm(BLH) is found by assuming that all the blood removed during ANH is returned to the patient at a rate sufficient to maintain the hematocrit at the minimum safe level

$$BL_H = \frac {RCM_H} {H_m}$$

If ANH is used as long as SBL does not exceed BL_{H} there will not be any need for blood transfusion. We can conclude from the foregoing that H should therefore not exceed s. The difference between the BL_{H} and the BL_{s} therefore is the incremental surgical blood loss (BL_{i}) possible when using ANH.

$$\ {BL_i} = {BL_H} - {BL_s}$$

When expressed in terms of the RCM

$${RCM_i} = {BL_i} \times {H_m}$$

Where RCM_{i} is the red cell mass that would have to be administered using homologous blood to maintain the H_{m} if ANH is not used and blood loss equals BLH.

The model used assumes ANH used for a 70 kg patient with an estimated blood volume of 70 ml/kg (4900 ml). A range of H_{i} and H_{m} was evaluated to understand conditions where hemodilution is necessary to benefit the patient.

==== Result ====
The result of the model calculations are presented in a table given in the appendix for a range of H_{i} from 0.30 to 0.50 with ANH performed to minimum hematocrits from 0.30 to 0.15. Given a H_{i} of 0.40, if the H_{m} is assumed to be 0.25.then from the equation above the RCM count is still high and ANH is not necessary, if BL_{s} does not exceed 2303 ml, since the hemotocrit will not fall below H_{m}, although five units of blood must be removed during hemodilution. Under these conditions, to achieve the maximum benefit from the technique if ANH is used, no homologous blood will be required to maintain the H_{m} if blood loss does not exceed 2940 ml. In such a case, ANH can save a maximum of 1.1 packed red blood cell unit equivalent, and homologous blood transfusion is necessary to maintain H_{m}, even if ANH is used. This model can be used to identify when ANH may be used for a given patient and the degree of ANH necessary to maximize that benefit.

For example, if H_{i} is 0.30 or less it is not possible to save a red cell mass equivalent to two units of homologous PRBC even if the patient is hemodiluted to an H_{m} of 0.15. That is because from the RCM equation the patient RCM falls short from the equation giving above. If H_{i} is 0.40 one must remove at least 7.5 units of blood during ANH, resulting in an H_{m} of 0.20 to save two units equivalence. Clearly, the greater the H_{i} and the greater the number of units removed during hemodilution, the more effective ANH is for preventing homologous blood transfusion. The model here is designed to allow doctors to determine where ANH may be beneficial for a patient based on their knowledge of the H_{i}, the potential for SBL, and an estimate of the H_{m}. Though the model used a 70 kg patient, the result can be applied to any patient. To apply these result to any body weight, any of the values BLs, BLH and ANHH or PRBC given in the table need to be multiplied by the factor we will call T

$$T = \frac  {\text{patient's weight in kg}} {70}$$

Basically, the model considered above is designed to predict the maximum RCM that can save ANH.

In summary, the efficacy of ANH has been described mathematically by means of measurements of surgical blood loss and blood volume flow measurement. This form of analysis permits accurate estimation of the potential efficiency of the techniques and shows the application of measurement in the medical field.

== Blood flow ==
=== Cardiac output ===
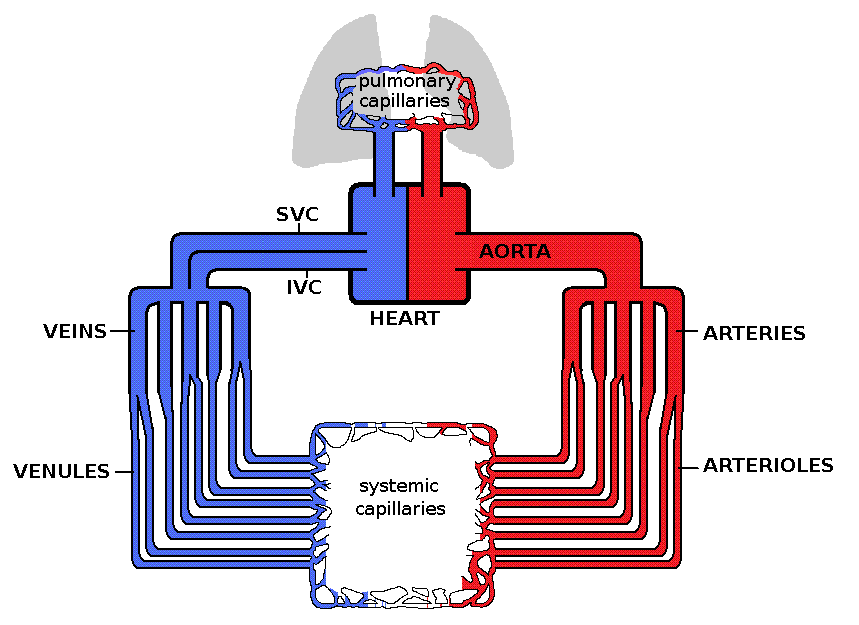
Diagram of the circulatory system. SVC/IVC - Superior/Inferior vena cava.

The heart is the driver of the circulatory system, pumping blood through rhythmic contraction and relaxation. The rate of blood flow out of the heart (often expressed in L/min) is known as the cardiac output (CO).

Blood being pumped out of the heart first enters the aorta, the largest artery of the body. It then proceeds to divide into smaller and smaller arteries, then into arterioles, and eventually capillaries, where oxygen transfer occurs. The capillaries connect to venules, and the blood then travels back through the network of veins to the venae cavae into the right heart. The micro-circulation — the arterioles, capillaries, and venules —constitutes most of the area of the vascular system and is the site of the transfer of O_{2}, glucose, and enzyme substrates into the cells. The venous system returns the de-oxygenated blood to the right heart where it is pumped into the lungs to become oxygenated and CO_{2} and other gaseous wastes exchanged and expelled during breathing. Blood then returns to the left side of the heart where it begins the process again.

In a normal circulatory system, the volume of blood returning to the heart each minute is approximately equal to the volume that is pumped out each minute (the cardiac output). Because of this, the velocity of blood flow across each level of the circulatory system is primarily determined by the total cross-sectional area of that level.

Cardiac output is determined by two methods. One is to use the Fick equation:

$CO = VO2/C_aO_2-C_vO_2$

The other thermodilution method is to sense the temperature change from a liquid injected in the proximal port of a Swan-Ganz to the distal port.

Cardiac output is mathematically expressed by the following equation:

$$CO = SV \times HR$$

where

- CO = cardiac output (L/sec)
- SV = stroke volume (ml)
- HR = heart rate (bpm)

The normal human cardiac output is 5-6 L/min at rest. Not all blood that enters the left ventricle exits the heart. What is left at the end of diastole (EDV) minus the stroke volume make up the end systolic volume (ESV).

==== Anatomical features ====
Circulatory system of species subjected to orthostatic blood pressure (such as arboreal snakes) has evolved with physiological and morphological features to overcome the circulatory disturbance. For instance, in arboreal snakes the heart is closer to the head, in comparison with aquatic snakes. This facilitates blood perfusion to the brain.

=== Turbulence ===
Blood flow is also affected by the smoothness of the vessels, resulting in either turbulent (chaotic) or laminar (smooth) flow. Smoothness is reduced by the buildup of fatty deposits on the arterial walls.

The Reynolds number (denoted NR or Re) is a relationship that helps determine the behavior of a fluid in a tube, in this case blood in the vessel.

The equation for this dimensionless relationship is written as:

$NR=\frac{\rho v L}{\mu}$
- ρ: density of the blood
- v: mean velocity of the blood
- L: characteristic dimension of the vessel, in this case diameter
- μ: viscosity of blood

The Reynolds number is directly proportional to the velocity and diameter of the tube. Note that NR is directly proportional to the mean velocity as well as the diameter. A Reynolds number of less than 2300 is laminar fluid flow, which is characterized by constant flow motion, whereas a value of over 4000, is represented as turbulent flow. Due to its smaller radius and lowest velocity compared to other vessels, the Reynolds number at the capillaries is very low, resulting in laminar instead of turbulent flow.

=== Velocity ===
Often expressed in cm/s. This value is inversely related to the total cross-sectional area of the blood vessel and also differs per cross-section, because in normal condition the blood flow has laminar characteristics. For this reason, the blood flow velocity is the fastest in the middle of the vessel and slowest at the vessel wall. In most cases, the mean velocity is used. There are many ways to measure blood flow velocity, like videocapillary microscoping with frame-to-frame analysis, or laser Doppler anemometry. Blood velocities in arteries are higher during systole than during diastole. One parameter to quantify this difference is the pulsatility index (PI), which is equal to the difference between the peak systolic velocity and the minimum diastolic velocity divided by the mean velocity during the cardiac cycle. This value decreases with distance from the heart.

$$PI = \frac{v_{systole} - v_{diastole}}{v_{mean}}$$

Relation between blood flow velocity and total cross-section area in human
Type of blood vessels	Total cross-section area	Blood velocity in cm/s
Aorta	3–5 cm^{2}	40 cm/s
Capillaries	4500–6000 cm^{2}	0.03 cm/s
Vena cavae inferior and superior	14 cm^{2}	15 cm/s

== Blood vessels ==
=== Vascular resistance ===
Resistance is also related to vessel radius, vessel length, and blood viscosity.

In a first approach based on fluids, as indicated by the Hagen–Poiseuille equation. The equation is as follows:

$\Delta P = \frac{8 \mu l Q}{\pi r^4}$
- ∆P: pressure drop/gradient
- μ: viscosity
- l: length of tube. In the case of vessels with infinitely long lengths, l is replaced with diameter of the vessel.
- Q: flow rate of the blood in the vessel
- r: radius of the vessel

In a second approach, more realistic of the vascular resistance and coming from experimental observations on blood flows, according to Thurston, there is a plasma release-cell layering at the walls surrounding a plugged flow. It is a fluid layer in which at a distance δ, viscosity η is a function of δ written as η(δ), and these surrounding layers do not meet at the vessel centre in real blood flow. Instead, there is the plugged flow which is hyperviscous because holding high concentration of RBCs. Thurston assembled this layer to the flow resistance to describe blood flow by means of a viscosity η(δ) and thickness δ from the wall layer.

The blood resistance law appears as R adapted to blood flow profile :

$R = \frac{c L \eta(\delta)}{(\pi \delta r^3)}$

where

- R = resistance to blood flow
- c = constant coefficient of flow
- L = length of the vessel
- η(δ) = viscosity of blood in the wall plasma release-cell layering
- r = radius of the blood vessel
- δ = distance in the plasma release-cell layer

Blood resistance varies depending on blood viscosity and its plugged flow (or sheath flow since they are complementary across the vessel section) size as well, and on the size of the vessels. Assuming steady, laminar flow in the vessel, the blood vessels behavior is similar to that of a pipe. For instance if p1 and p2 are pressures are at the ends of the tube, the pressure drop/gradient is:

$$\frac{p_1 - p_2}{l} = \Delta P$$

The larger arteries, including all large enough to see without magnification, are conduits with low vascular resistance (assuming no advanced atherosclerotic changes) with high flow rates that generate only small drops in pressure. The smaller arteries and arterioles have higher resistance, and confer the main blood pressure drop across major arteries to capillaries in the circulatory system.

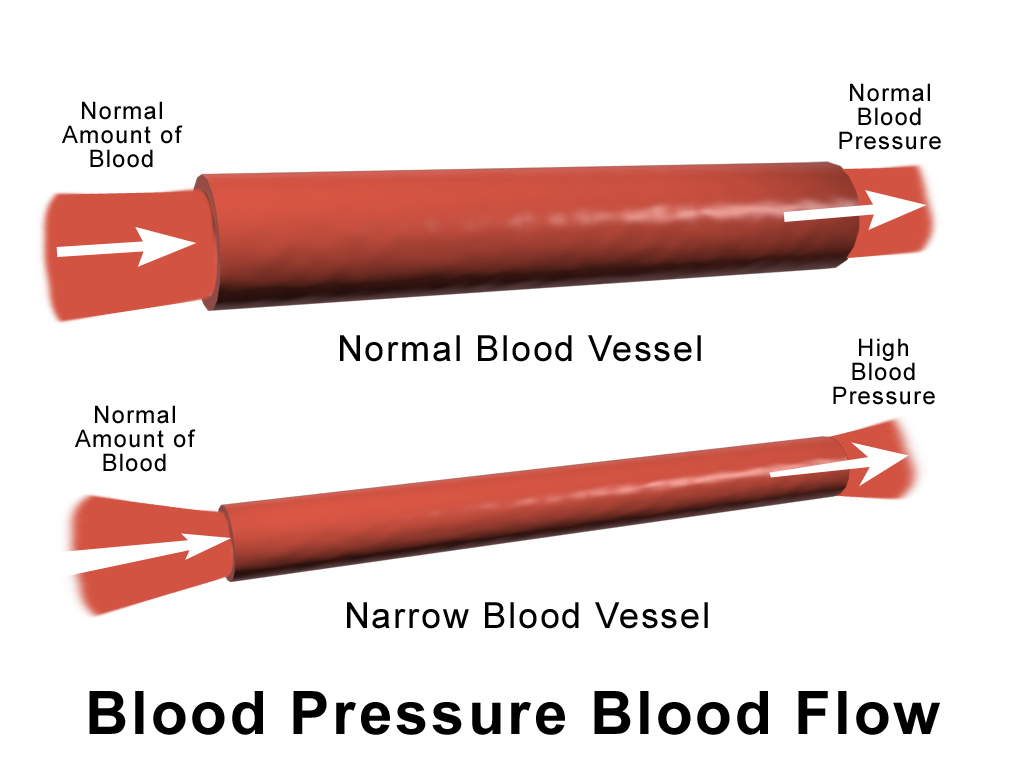
Illustration demonstrating how vessel narrowing, or vasoconstriction, increases blood pressure

In the arterioles blood pressure is lower than in the major arteries. This is due to bifurcations, which cause a drop in pressure. The more bifurcations, the higher the total cross-sectional area, therefore the pressure across the surface drops. This is why the arterioles have the highest pressure-drop. The pressure drop of the arterioles is the product of flow rate and resistance: ∆P=Q xresistance. The high resistance observed in the arterioles, which factor largely in the ∆P is a result of a smaller radius of about 30 μm. The smaller the radius of a tube, the larger the resistance to fluid flow.

Immediately following the arterioles are the capillaries. Following the logic observed in the arterioles, we expect the blood pressure to be lower in the capillaries compared to the arterioles. Since pressure is a function of force per unit area, (P = F/A), the larger the surface area, the lesser the pressure when an external force acts on it. Though the radii of the capillaries are very small, the network of capillaries has the largest surface area in the vascular network. They are known to have the largest surface area (485 mm^2) in the human vascular network. The larger the total cross-sectional area, the lower the mean velocity as well as the pressure.

Substances called vasoconstrictors can reduce the size of blood vessels, thereby increasing blood pressure. Vasodilators (such as nitroglycerin) increase the size of blood vessels, thereby decreasing arterial pressure.

If the blood viscosity increases (gets thicker), the result is an increase in arterial pressure. Certain medical conditions can change the viscosity of the blood. For instance, anemia (low red blood cell concentration) reduces viscosity, whereas increased red blood cell concentration increases viscosity. It had been thought that aspirin and related "blood thinner" drugs decreased the viscosity of blood, but instead studies found that they act by reducing the tendency of the blood to clot.

To determine the systemic vascular resistance (SVR) the formula for calculating all resistance is used.

$R = (\Delta pressure) / flow.$

This translates for SVR into:

$SVR=(MAP -CVP)/CO$

Where

- SVR = systemic vascular resistance (mmHg/L/min)
- MAP = mean arterial pressure (mmHg)
- CVP = central venous pressure (mmHg)
- CO = cardiac output (L/min)

To get this in Wood units the answer is multiplied by 80.

Normal systemic vascular resistance is between 900 and 1440 dynes/sec/cm−5.

=== Wall tension ===
Components of cylinder stress

Regardless of site, blood pressure is related to the wall tension of the vessel according to the Young–Laplace equation (assuming that the thickness of the vessel wall is very small as compared to the diameter of the lumen):

$$\sigma_\theta = \dfrac{Pr}{t} \$$

where

- P is the blood pressure
- t is the wall thickness
- r is the inside radius of the cylinder.
- $\sigma_\theta \!$ is the cylinder stress or "hoop stress".

For the thin-walled assumption to be valid the vessel must have a wall thickness of no more than about one-tenth (often cited as one twentieth) of its radius.

The cylinder stress, in turn, is the average force exerted circumferentially (perpendicular both to the axis and to the radius of the object) in the cylinder wall, and can be described as:

$$\sigma_\theta = \dfrac{F}{tl} \$$

where:

- F is the force exerted circumferentially on an area of the cylinder wall that has the following two lengths as sides:
- t is the radial thickness of the cylinder
- l is the axial length of the cylinder

=== Stress ===
When force is applied to a material it starts to deform or move. As the force needed to deform a material (e.g. to make a fluid flow) increases with the size of the surface of the material A., the magnitude of this force F is proportional to the area A of the portion of the surface. Therefore, the quantity (F/A) that is the force per unit area is called the stress. The shear stress at the wall that is associated with blood flow through an artery depends on the artery size and geometry and can range between 0.5 and 4 Pa.

$$\sigma = \frac{F}{A}$$.

Under normal conditions, to avoid atherogenesis, thrombosis, smooth muscle proliferation and endothelial apoptosis, shear stress maintains its magnitude and direction within an acceptable range. In some cases occurring due to blood hammer, shear stress reaches larger values. While the direction of the stress may also change by the reverse flow, depending on the hemodynamic conditions. Therefore, this situation can lead to atherosclerosis disease.

Laminar shear of fluid between two plates. $v=u, \tau=\sigma$. Friction between the fluid and the moving boundaries causes the fluid to shear (flow). The force required for this action per unit area is the stress. The relation between the stress (force) and the shear rate (flow velocity) determines the viscosity.

=== Capacitance ===
Veins are described as the "capacitance vessels" of the body because over 70% of the blood volume resides in the venous system. Veins are more compliant than arteries and expand to accommodate changing volume.

== Blood pressure ==
The blood pressure in the circulation is principally due to the pumping action of the heart. The pumping action of the heart generates pulsatile blood flow, which is conducted into the arteries, across the micro-circulation and eventually, back via the venous system to the heart. During each heartbeat, systemic arterial blood pressure varies between a maximum (systolic) and a minimum (diastolic) pressure. In physiology, these are often simplified into one value, the mean arterial pressure (MAP), which is calculated as follows:

$MAP = DP + 1/3(PP)$

where:

- MAP = Mean Arterial Pressure
- DP = Diastolic blood pressure
- PP = Pulse pressure which is systolic pressure minus diastolic pressure.

Differences in mean blood pressure are responsible for blood flow from one location to another in the circulation. The rate of mean blood flow depends on both blood pressure and the resistance to flow presented by the blood vessels. Mean blood pressure decreases as the circulating blood moves away from the heart through arteries and capillaries due to viscous losses of energy. Mean blood pressure drops over the whole circulation, although most of the fall occurs along the small arteries and arterioles. Gravity affects blood pressure via hydrostatic forces (e.g., during standing), and valves in veins, breathing, and pumping from contraction of skeletal muscles also influence blood pressure in veins.

The relationship between pressure, flow, and resistance is expressed in the following equation:

$$Flow = Pressure/Resistance$$

When applied to the circulatory system, we get:

$$CO = (MAP-RAP)/SVR$$

where

- CO = cardiac output (in L/min)
- MAP = mean arterial pressure (in mmHg), the average pressure of blood as it leaves the heart
- RAP = right atrial pressure (in mmHg), the average pressure of blood as it returns to the heart
- SVR = systemic vascular resistance (in mmHg * min/L)

A simplified form of this equation assumes right atrial pressure is approximately 0:

$$CO\approx MAP/SVR$$

The ideal blood pressure in the brachial artery, where standard blood pressure cuffs measure pressure, is <120/80 mmHg. Other major arteries have similar levels of blood pressure recordings indicating very low disparities among major arteries. In the innominate artery, the average reading is 110/70 mmHg, the right subclavian artery averages 120/80 and the abdominal aorta is 110/70 mmHg. The relatively uniform pressure in the arteries indicate that these blood vessels act as a pressure reservoir for fluids that are transported within them.

Pressure drops gradually as blood flows from the major arteries, through the arterioles, the capillaries until blood is pushed up back into the heart via the venules, the veins through the vena cava with the help of the muscles. At any given pressure drop, the flow rate is determined by the resistance to the blood flow. In the arteries, with the absence of diseases, there is very little or no resistance to blood. The vessel diameter is the most principal determinant to control resistance. Compared to other smaller vessels in the body, the artery has a much bigger diameter (4 mm), therefore the resistance is low.

The arm–leg (blood pressure) gradient is the difference between the blood pressure measured in the arms and that measured in the legs. It is normally less than 10 mm Hg, but may be increased in e.g. coarctation of the aorta.

== Clinical significance ==
=== Pressure monitoring ===
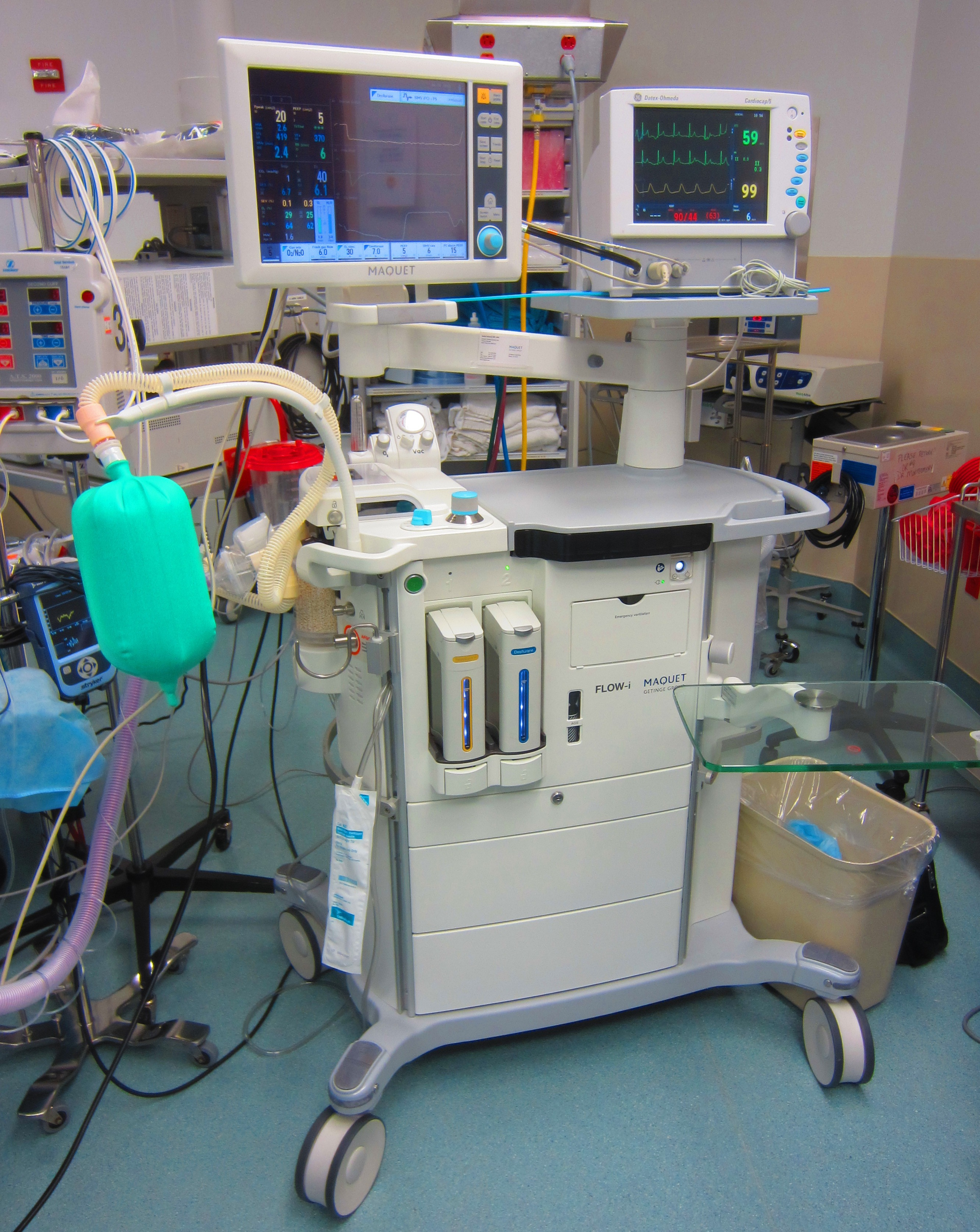
An anesthetic machine with integrated systems for monitoring of several hemodynamic parameters, including blood pressure and heart rate

Hemodynamic monitoring is the observation of hemodynamic parameters over time, such as blood pressure and heart rate. Blood pressure can be monitored either invasively through an inserted blood pressure transducer assembly (providing continuous monitoring), or noninvasively by repeatedly measuring the blood pressure with an inflatable blood pressure cuff.

Hypertension is diagnosed by the presence of arterial blood pressures of 140/90 or greater for two clinical visits.

Pulmonary Artery Wedge Pressure can show if there is congestive heart failure, mitral and aortic valve disorders, hypervolemia, shunts, or cardiac tamponade.

=== Remote, indirect monitoring of blood flow by laser Doppler ===
Laser Doppler imaging reveals retinal blood flow

Noninvasive hemodynamic monitoring of eye fundus vessels can be performed by Laser Doppler holography, with near infrared light. The eye offers a unique opportunity for the non-invasive exploration of cardiovascular diseases. Laser Doppler imaging by digital holography can measure blood flow in the retina and choroid, whose Doppler responses exhibit a pulse-shaped profile with time This technique enables non invasive functional microangiography by high-contrast measurement of Doppler responses from endoluminal blood flow profiles in vessels in the posterior segment of the eye. Differences in blood pressure drive the flow of blood throughout the circulation. The rate of mean blood flow depends on both blood pressure and the hemodynamic resistance to flow presented by the blood vessels.

== Glossary ==
ANH
Acute Normovolemic Hemodilution
ANH_{u}
Number of Units During ANH
BL_{H}
Maximum Blood Loss Possible When ANH Is Used Before Homologous Blood Transfusion Is Needed
BL_{I}
Incremental Blood Loss Possible with ANH.(BL_{H} – BL_{s})
BL_{s}
Maximum blood loss without ANH before homologous blood transfusion is required
EBV
Estimated Blood Volume(70 mL/kg)
Hct
Haematocrit Always Expressed Here As A Fraction
H_{i}
Initial Haematocrit
H_{m}
Minimum Safe Haematocrit
PRBC
Packed Red Blood Cell Equivalent Saved by ANH
RCM
Red cell mass.
RCM_{H}
Cell Mass Available For Transfusion after ANH
RCM_{I}
Red Cell Mass Saved by ANH
SBL
Surgical Blood Loss

== Etymology and pronunciation ==
The word hemodynamics (/ˌhiːmədaɪˈnæmɪks, -moʊ-/) uses combining forms of hemo- (which comes from the ancient Greek haima, meaning blood) and dynamics, thus "the dynamics of blood". The vowel of the hemo- syllable is variously written according to the ae/e variation.

- Biofluid dynamics
- Body fluid
- Blood hammer
- Blood pressure
- Cardiac output
- Cardiovascular System Dynamics Society
- Electrical cardiometry
- Esophogeal doppler
- Hemodynamics of the aorta
- Impedance cardiography
- Photoplethysmogram
- Laser Doppler imaging
- Windkessel effect
- Functional near-infrared spectroscopy

== Bibliography ==
- Berne RM, Levy MN (1997). Cardiovascular Physiology (7th ed.). Mosby.
- Bigatello LM, George E (April 2002). "Hemodynamic Monitoring". Minerva Anestesiologica. 68 (4): 219–225. PMID 12024086.
- Braunwald E, ed. (1997). Heart Disease: A Textbook of Cardiovascular Medicine (5th ed.). W.B. Saunders.
- Franceschi C (1979). L'investigation vasculaire par ultrasonographie Doppler. Masson. ISBN 978-2-22563-679-0.
- Franceschi C, Zamboni P (2009). Principles of Venous Hemodynamics. Nova Science Publishers. ISBN 978-1-60692-485-3.
- Milnor WR (1982). Hemodynamics. Williams & Wilkins.
- Otto CM, Stoddard M, Waggoner A, Zoghbi WA (2002). "Recommendations for Quantification of Doppler Echocardiography: A Report from the Doppler Quantification Task Force of the Nomenclature and Standards Committee of the American Society of Echocardiography". Journal of the American Society of Echocardiography. 15 (2): 167–184. doi:10.1067/mje.2002.120202. PMID 11836492.
- Peterson LH (1954). "The Dynamics of Pulsatile Blood Flow". Circulation Research. 2 (2): 127–139. doi:10.1161/01.RES.2.2.127. PMID 13141376.
- Rowell LB (1993). Human Cardiovascular Control. Oxford University Press.
- Siderman S, Beyar R, Kleber AG (1991). Cardiac Electrophysiology, Circulation and Transport. Kluwer Academic Publishers.
- Sramek BB (2002). Systemic Hemodynamics and Hemodynamic Management (4th ed.). ESBN. ISBN 978-1-59196-046-1.
- "American Heart Association". American Heart Association.
- Franceschi C. "Venous Insufficiency of the Pelvis and Lower Extremities: Hemodynamic Rationale" (PDF).
