= Photoplethysmogram variability =

The photoplethysmogram (PPG) measurement made at a peripheral site, such as the finger, ear or forehead represents the volume of blood in the vessel at the site of measurement. The PPG signal consists of pulses that reflect the change in vascular blood volume with each cardiac beat. Beat-to-beat fluctuations, known as photoplethysmogram variability (PPGV) are found in the signal baseline and amplitude which reflects various physiological influences such as respiration and regulation of vascular tone by the sympathetic nervous system.

== Frequency domain (spectral) features ==
The beat-to-beat variation of the PPG in time domain can be represented in the frequency domain by means of signal transformation methods, such as fast Fourier transform or autoregressive model. The spectrum can be divided into two main bands, that is, low frequency (LF) band ranging from 0.04 to 0.15 Hz and high frequency (HF) band between 0.15 and 0.6 Hz. The LF band can be subdivided into a mid-frequency (MF) band from 0.09 Hz to 0.15 Hz. The integration of the power spectral density over the frequency range will give the spectral power. Low-frequency oscillation in the PPG is found to reflect the sympathetic control over the peripheral circulation, whilst the high frequency component is related to the mechanical consequence of respiration on venous return.

== Applications ==
The PPGV was found to be useful in detecting blood loss by observing the spectral features of the PPGV. LF power, together with other features derived from the PPG waveform, was used to classify patients into different ranges of systemic vascular resistance, which may be used as an indicator of critical illness. It has been proposed that the PPGV can also be used as an indicator of peripheral circulatory abnormalities in sepsis patients. The application of PPGV as an indicator of sepsis has been extended by using spectral analysis of the PPGV to classify patients into different severity of sepsis.

== See also ==
- Heart rate variability
