= Mikito =

- Gender: Male

Origin
- Origin: Japanese
- Meaning: Different meanings depending on the kanji used

Mikito (written: 右人 or 幹人) is a masculine Japanese given name. Notable people with the name include:

- Mikito Tachizaki (立崎 幹人; born 1988), Japanese biathlete
- Mikito Takayasu (高安 右人; 1860–1938), Japanese ophthalmologist
