= Renal index =

Renal index may refer to:

- Renal failure index: Urine Sodium * Plasma Creatinine / Urine Creatinine
- Renal arterial resistivity index: (Systolic velocity - diastolic velocity) / Systolic velocity
