= Bernhard Roth =

German experimental physicist

Bernhard Wilhelm Roth
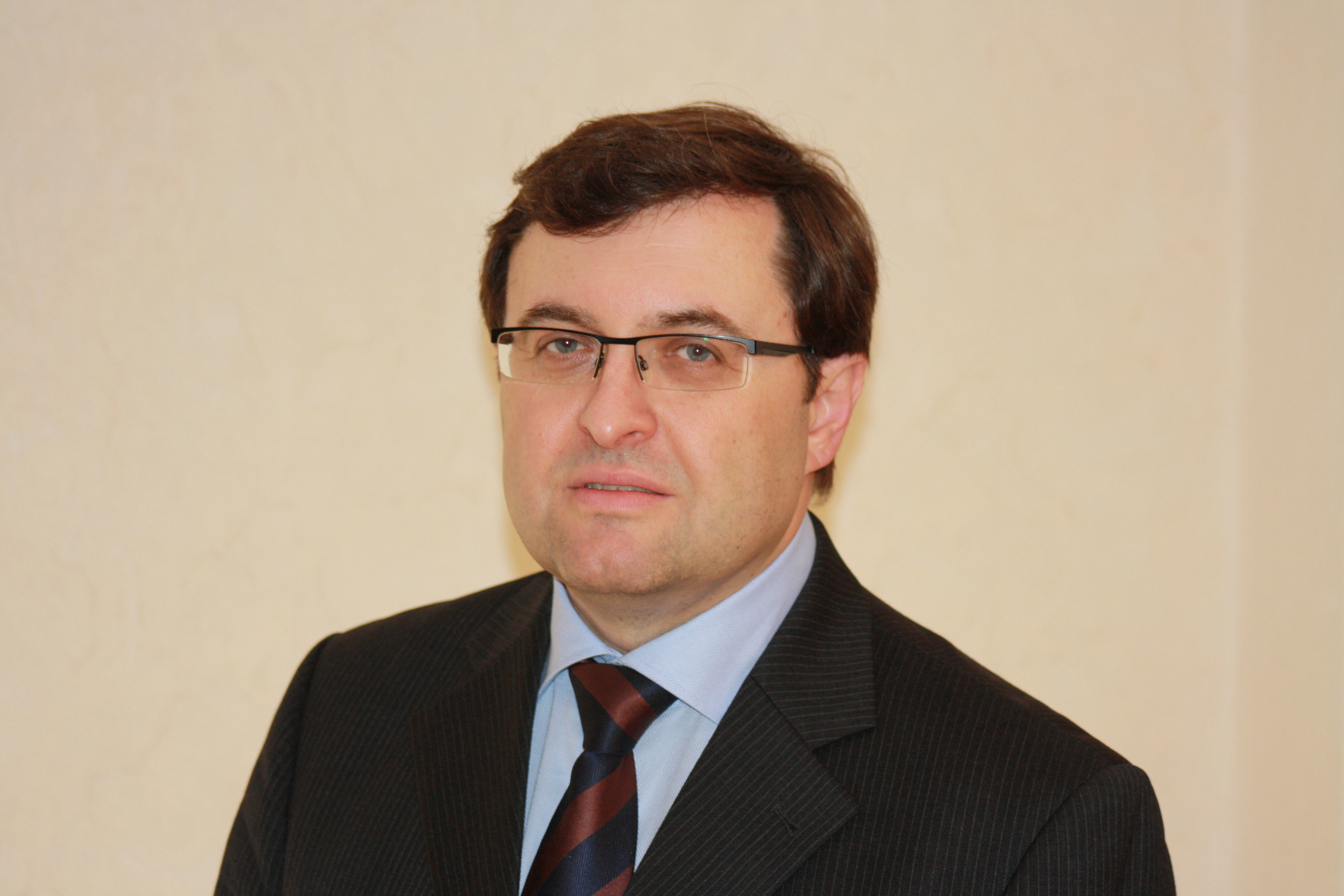
- Born: November 13, 1970 (age 55)
- Scientific career
- Fields: Experimental physics

Bernhard Wilhelm Roth (born 13 November 1970) is a German experimental physicist.

== Scientific career ==
From 1992 to 1997 Roth studied physics at Bielefeld University from where he obtained his diploma in physics. He received his doctoral degree (Dr. rer. nat.) in the field of atomic and particle physics at Bielefeld University. From 2002 to 2007 he worked as assistant professor and group leader in experimental quantum optics at the Institute for Experimental Physics, Quantum Optics and Relativity Group at Heinrich Heine University Düsseldorf. In 2007 Roth obtained his state doctorate (Habilitation) in experimental physics in the field of production and spectroscopy on ultracold molecular ions at Heinrich Heine University Düsseldorf. From 2007 to 2010 he was associate professor and group leader at the Institute for Experimental Physics at Heinrich Heine University Düsseldorf and from 2011 to 2012 center manager at the Centre for Innovation Competence innoFSPEC Potsdam of the Leibniz Institute for Astrophysics Potsdam (AIP) and the University of Potsdam. Since 2012 he is scientific and managing director of the Hannover Centre for Optical Technologies HOT, an interdisciplinary research centre at Leibniz University Hannover. In 2012 Roth also obtained his state doctorate in physics at Leibniz University Hannover and in 2014 he was appointed professor in physics at the Faculty of Mathematics and Physics of Leibniz University Hannover, see also. As director of HOT he is one of the coordinators of the International Master Program Optical Technologies: Photonics and Laser Technology (M.Sc.) at Leibniz University Hannover.

== Research ==
The scientific activities of B. Roth are focused on applied and fundamental research in optics and photonics. This includes the development of integrated functional photonics and polymer-optical sensing, e.g., based on fibre-optic or planar concepts, laser spectroscopy, optofluidics, and analytics in the life sciences, optical technologies for multimodal imaging in medicine, information and illumination technology as well as digital holography. Furthermore, hybrid multi-physics and multi-scale numerical simulations for complex optical systems and algorithms for simulation inversion are investigated. Initial research fields include quantum optics and laser spectroscopy, in particular laser cooling of trapped atomic and molecular ions and high-precision laser spectroscopy of ultracold molecular ions, as well as low-energy atomic and particle physics. Roth is member of the Collaborative Research Center PlanOS - Planar optronic systems applicant team, and one of the principal investigators (PI) in the Cluster of Excellence PhoenixD: Photonics, Optics, Engineering - Innovation Across Disciplines of the German Research Foundation DFG, which explores the possibilities of digitalization for novel optical and photonic systems as well as their production and application.

== Awards ==
Roth is recipient of the prestigious Kaiser-Friedrich Forschungspreis 2018 (Kaiser-Friedrich Research Award 2018) for Photonic Technologies for the Digital Laboratory for the project SmartSens together with Dr. Johanna-Gabriela Walter (TCI, Leibniz University Hannover) and Dr. Kort Bremer (HOT, Leibniz University Hannover). The prize was awarded for the development of novel smartphone-based optical sensing for medicine and the life sciences.

In 2021, Roth received the Kaiser-Friedrich Forschungspreis 2020 (Kaiser-Friedrich Research Award 2020) for Photonic Technologies in Environmental and Climate Protection together with Dr. Ann-Kathrin Kniggendorf (HOT, Leibniz University Hannover) for the project OPTIMUS. The prize was awarded for the development of new optical systems for the online-detection of microplastics in the environment.

In 2024 Roth, together with an interdisciplinary team from physics and medicine at Leibniz University Hannover (group headed by Prof. Dr. Bernhard Roth) and the University Medical Centre Rostock (group headed by Prof. Dr. Steffen Emmert), received the prestigious Helmholtz Prize in the field of Applied Metrology for innovations in optical biopsy for skin cancer diagnostics The team developed a novel multimodal system for in vivo detection of skin cancer and validated its functionality in clinical measurements.

== Publications ==
- Roth, Bernhard (2001). Spinabhängige Asymmetriefunktionen in der elastischen und inelastischen Elektron-Cäsium-Streuung bei mittleren Energien. Bielefeld University (doctoral thesis, German).
- Roth, Bernhard (2007). Production, Manipulation and Spectroscopy of Cold Trapped Molecular Ions. Düsseldorf University (habilitation thesis).

As author / co-author he contributed, for example, to the following books:

- Friedrich, B.; Krems, R.; Stwalley, W. (Eds.) (2009). Cold Molecules: Theory, Experiment, Applications. CRC Press, Taylor and Francis. ISBN 978-1420059038.
- Roth, B. (2008). Cold Molecules: Cold Trapped Molecular Ions - Production, Manipulation, and Spectroscopy. VDM Verlag Saarbrücken. ISBN 978-3-8364-9399-4.
- Lachmayer, R.; Lippert, R.B.; Kaierle, S. (Eds.) (2017). Additive Serienfertigung - Erfolgsfaktoren und Handlungsfelder für die Anwendung. Springer Vieweg Verlag. ISBN 978-3-662-56462-2.
