= Resistivity index =

Resistivity index may refer to:

- Arterial resistivity index, Pourcelot index
- Archie's law, electrical resistivity index
