= Hemodynamics of the aorta =

Study of the flow patterns and forces in the thoracic aorta

Anatomical location of the thoracic aorta

The hemodynamics of the aorta is an ongoing field of research in which the goal is to identify what flow patterns and subsequent forces occur within the thoracic aorta. These patterns and forces are used to identify the presence and severity of cardiovascular diseases such as aortic aneurysm and atherosclerosis. Some of the methods used to study the hemodynamics of aortic flow are patient scans, computational fluid dynamics models, and particle tracking velocimetry (PTV). The information gathered through these studies can be used for surgery planning and the development of implants. Greater understanding of this topic reduces mortality rates associated with cardiovascular disease.

== General flow patterns ==
The mean velocity in the aorta varies over the cardiac cycle. During systole the mean velocity rises to a peak, then it falls during diastole. This pattern is repeated with each squeezing pulse of the heart. The highest velocities are found at the exit of the valve during systole. At this stage the majority of the flow can be described with velocity vectors normal to the entrance, but in plane velocities tangent to the flow are present. As the path starts to curve in the ascending aorta, the blood towards the outside of the arch tends to rotate towards the inner wall, causing a helical pattern that is observed in most individuals. As the blood moves into the aortic arch, the area with the highest velocity tends to be on the inner wall. Helical flow within the ascending aorta and aortic arch help to reduce flow stagnation and increase oxygen transport. As the blood moves into the descending aorta, rotations in the flow are less present. Physiological abnormalities due to plague formation or aneurysm lead to helical flows and high velocity flows in locations where they would not normally be present or as prominent. The abnormal high velocity areas generate a higher amount of wall shear stress than normal and contribute to stenosis and further plaque formation. Abnormal helical structures expose tissue to low wall shear stresses that it would not normally experience. Simulations of these flow patterns seek to identify what normal wall shear stress conditions and helical flows are present at specific location within the aorta.

== Effect of age and sex ==
When evaluating the significance of the hemodynamics of a patient their age and gender play a role. Each individual will have specific aortic geometries but trends can be identified when observed as a group. As age increases the aortic diameter tends to increase and the peak velocity of systolic flow tends to decrease until patients reach an age greater than 60 years old. Patients over the age of 60 tend to have an increase of peak systolic velocity. While both sexes experience the same pattern of velocity change with age, men tend to experience a wider range and higher peak velocity with age.

== Effect of diabetes ==
Diabetes mellitus (diabetes) is a significant risk factor for cardiovascular diseases. The presence of diabetes affects the dynamic viscosity of blood and the compliance of the aortic walls. The dynamic viscosity of blood where diabetes is present is higher than that of healthy blood making it slightly less resistive to flow. The Young's modulus of the aortic walls where diabetes is present is higher than that of a healthy patient making it more stiff. When comparing CFD models of normal blood and wall properties with CFD models where the blood and wall properties to replicate that of an individual with diabetes, it is found that the models with diabetes have a lower mean velocity. It is also observed that the outlet velocity of the descending aorta is lower in the diabetes model. The blood pressure in the diabetes model is lower than that of the control model, but the mean pressures of the entire aorta are similar between both models.

== Modeling of aortic flow ==
=== CFD modeling of the aorta ===
CFD models allow for researchers to recreate flows happening within the aorta and evaluate factors that cannot be obtained through normal patient scans. These factors include wall shear stress and helicity. These factors are then used to evaluate the progression and severity of cardiovascular diseases.

==== Patient specific information ====
In order to replicate patient-specific geometries a CT scan or an MRI is taken. From this scan the inlet, various outlets, and walls can be digitally reconstructed to create the control volume. A common software used to construct the geometry and discretize the mesh is ANSYS. The inlet is identified as the cross section directly above the aortic valve. The outlets are identified as the brachiocephalic artery, left and right common carotid artery, subclavian artery, and the descending aorta.

In order to replicate the flow velocities that occur in individual patients a PC-MRI is taken. The PC-MRI can be taken be 1D, 3D, or 4D. 1D PC-MRIs only capture the velocity in one direction, typically axially with the inlet. A 4D PC-MRI can capture the axial through plane velocity, as well as orthogonal in plane velocities. Although 4D PC-MRIs provide more accurate and useful information on the flow, 1D PC-MRIs are more commonly taken and used in CFD modeling of the aorta. Wall shear stress and helicity of the flow tend to be influenced by which type of velocity information is used in the model.

==== Boundary conditions ====
There are a variety of flows that have been modeled and studied as the inlet boundary condition. Some simplified flows include plug flow, parabolic flow, linear shear flow, and skewed cubic flow. 1D and 3D flows generated from patient scans can be used as more accurate inlet conditions. 1D flows include the patient-specific variation of velocity normal to inlet. 3D flows include patient-specific velocities in the inlet plane in addition to the velocities normal to the inlet. The more accurate inlet conditions are oftentimes not used because the high acquisition time and low spatial resolution of the PC-MRIs needed.

In each patient-specific model there are multiple outlets. The most common outlet boundary conditions used are the two and three-element Windkessel models. The two-element Windkessel model replicates viscous resistance immediately downstream from the outlet and the three-element Windkessel model accounts for the resistance of capillaries and venous circulation. Comparing the results of the two outlet conditions there is no significant difference in wall shear stress. It has been found that the outlet boundary condition has an effect on less of the total flow than the inlet boundary condition. Because of this, the inlet boundary condition has been of higher focus in most CFD studies.

==== Limitations in modeling ====
Because there is no standard for setting inlet boundary condition in CFD models, they have to be verified with experimental results. Those results can be obtained either through in vivo measurements using 4D PC-MRIs. 4D PC-MRI's are also limited because the acquisition time is high, the spatial and temporal resolution is low, and the signal to noise ratio is also low.

=== Particle tracking velocimetry ===
Particle tracking velocimetry (PTV) allows for researchers to create an experimental setup to evaluate aortic flow patterns.

==== Methods ====
A CT scan or MRI is taken of a patient to obtain the geometry of the aorta. The information from that scan is then used to create a physical model made from a transparent silicone material. The material used can either be compliant, in order to replicate the dilation of the valve, or rigid. The working fluid within the model should have a refractive index to match that of the material used to create the model. Fluorescent tracers in the working fluid are illuminated by a laser in the volume of interest. A single high speed camera can be used to capture four separate images of the same illuminated volume using and image splitter and four mirrors.

The pulsating flow of the aorta is replicated by a ventricular assist device (VAD). The VAD is driven by a pump with a waveform to replicate the systole and diastole of the flow. When the pump is running, the high speed camera collects images of the tracers within the volume under investigation. A 3D velocity profile of the volume under investigation can be created from the particle movement from frame to frame. Focusing on different control volumes within the model allow for the creation of velocity profiles at different locations within the aorta.

==== Application of results ====
PTV velocity information can be used in place of 4D PC-MRI information in a CFD model. The 3D velocity information from the inlet of the PTV model can be applied as the inlet boundary condition in a CFD model. That CFD model can then solve for wall shear stresses. The velocity information from PTV can also be used to create an MRI simulation. The MRI simulation can then be used to assess progression of cardiovascular diseases.
