= Laser Doppler imaging =

- Example of flow-contrast microangiography in the optic disc region of the human retina, rendered computationally from Doppler-sensitive optical fluctuations (camera-based implementation; see § Digital holography / laser Doppler holography).
- Synonyms: Laser Doppler perfusion imaging (LDPI); Laser Doppler perfusion imaging (LDI)
- Purpose: Map microvascular perfusion (blood-flow–related signal) non-invasively
- Test of: Microcirculation / perfusion
- Based on: Laser Doppler flowmetry, dynamic light scattering, coherent speckle fluctuation analysis; (in some implementations) digital holography

Laser Doppler imaging (LDI), also called laser Doppler perfusion imaging (LDPI), is a non-contact optical technique for mapping signals related to microvascular blood perfusion in tissue. It illuminates tissue with coherent laser light and analyzes temporal fluctuations in the backscattered light caused by scattering from moving red blood cells; these fluctuations contain Doppler-broadened frequency components. LDI typically reports a perfusion-related index (often in arbitrary perfusion units) proportional to the amount of moving blood cells and their velocities within the sampled volume, rather than a direct absolute volumetric flow rate.

== History ==
Coherent-light scattering was introduced as a noninvasive way to evaluate microcirculation in the mid-1970s by M. D. Stern. Subsequent developments transitioned from single-point laser Doppler flowmetry to imaging approaches that scan a laser beam across tissue or use camera-based full-field acquisition to obtain spatial perfusion maps.

== Principle ==
In LDI, coherent laser light enters tissue and undergoes multiple scattering. Light scattered by moving red blood cells acquires Doppler frequency shifts; when combined with light scattered by static structures, the detected optical field exhibits time-varying interference (speckle fluctuations) whose spectrum broadens with blood-cell motion. A detector (photodiode in scanning systems, or a camera in full-field systems) measures these fluctuations, and signal processing yields a perfusion-related index.

Because the measured signal depends on scattering geometry, tissue optical properties, and the distribution of velocities and blood-cell concentrations within the sampling volume, LDI outputs are most commonly treated as relative indices and are most reliable for within-subject or standardized protocol comparisons.

== Instrumentation ==
=== Scanning-beam laser Doppler perfusion imaging (LDPI) ===
In classic LDPI, a low-power laser beam is scanned across a region (e.g., with galvanometer mirrors). For each position, a photodetector captures backscattered light and the temporal signal is analyzed to estimate a perfusion index. Scanning approaches trade acquisition time for large fields of view and straightforward detection hardware.

=== Full-field / camera-based LDI ===
In full-field implementations, a camera records intensity fluctuations over many pixels simultaneously, enabling faster acquisition and real-time visualization in some systems. Depending on the region size, exposure time, and processing scheme, full-field LDI can operate at video-rate update speeds and is often used for dynamic perfusion mapping in skin and other accessible tissues.

== Signal processing and quantitative interpretation ==
Processing typically estimates a perfusion-related quantity from the power spectrum (or related statistics) of the detected fluctuations. Practical steps often include:

- motion-artifact mitigation (bulk motion can dominate Doppler spectra);
- spatial/temporal averaging to improve signal-to-noise;
- protocol-dependent corrections (e.g., the “biological zero” in skin microvascular assessments).

Because the relationship between Doppler spectra and absolute flow is model-dependent and tissue-specific, many applications interpret LDI as a calibrated index rather than a direct measure of volumetric blood flow.

== Clinical and research applications ==
LDI has been applied across multiple disciplines where microcirculatory function is clinically relevant.

=== Burn depth assessment and wound care ===
LDI/LDPI has been widely investigated for burn depth assessment and prediction of healing, leveraging the fact that superficial and deep burns exhibit different perfusion patterns. Reviews and clinical studies describe its value as a noninvasive adjunct for clinical decision-making while emphasizing methodological and implementation considerations.

=== Rheumatology and peripheral vascular disorders ===
In Raynaud’s phenomenon and systemic sclerosis, LDI has been used to quantify microvascular flow and assess responses to provocation or therapy, offering an imaging alternative to single-point laser Doppler measurements.

=== Comparison with laser speckle contrast imaging (LSCI) ===
LDI/LDPI is often compared with laser speckle contrast imaging (LSCI), another coherent-light method for perfusion mapping. Comparative studies report differences in acquisition speed, spatial/temporal resolution, and practical trade-offs, and emphasize that the techniques have distinct signal formation and calibration characteristics.

== Digital holography / laser Doppler holography ==
Laser Doppler holography (LDH) is a camera-based, full-field implementation of laser Doppler imaging that uses digital holography (interferometric recording followed by numerical wave propagation and reconstruction) to compute Doppler-sensitive perfusion and flow-contrast maps. In LDH, an interferogram is recorded on a high-speed camera, digitally propagated to reconstruct the complex optical field, and temporally demodulated to extract Doppler-sensitive fluctuations caused by moving blood cells.

=== Use in ophthalmology ===
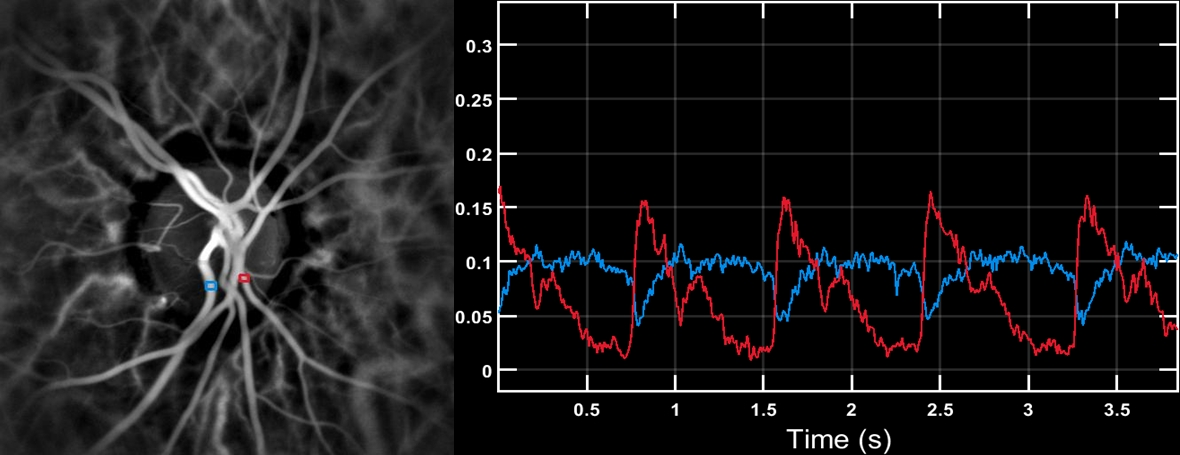
Blood-flow pulse wave in the central retinal artery (red) and vein (blue), measured by Laser Doppler holography in the eye fundus of a healthy volunteer.

The eye offers a unique opportunity for non-invasive assessment of microvascular function because the retina, optic nerve head and (to a lesser extent) the choroid can be interrogated optically through largely transparent media. In ophthalmic implementations, laser Doppler holography (LDH) is a full-field, camera-based interferometric approach related to laser Doppler imaging in which the complex optical field backscattered by the fundus is measured by digital holography (e.g. with interferometric mixing against a reference beam). After numerical reconstruction of the complex field (amplitude and phase), temporal fluctuations of the reconstructed signal are analyzed (typically in the frequency domain) to form power-Doppler flow-contrast images and vessel-resolved time series that are related to blood-flow dynamics in retinal and choroidal vasculature.

LDH has been reported to measure blood-flow–related signals in the retina and to generate microangiography-like maps of flow contrast over the posterior pole, including the peripapillary region and major retinal vessels. In addition to static flow-contrast imaging, LDH supports beat-resolved analysis: waveform-processing approaches have been used to isolate pulsatile components, derive indices of flow pulsatility and timing, and differentiate arteries and veins based on characteristic systole–diastole variations. Beat-resolved hemodynamic indices are of broader interest in ophthalmology because abnormal retinal vascular pulsatility and resistance-related metrics have been associated with ocular and systemic vascular changes in other modalities (e.g. increased pulsatility in age-related macular degeneration and altered resistive index in diabetic retinopathy.

The choroid is a highly vascularized tissue supplying the retinal pigment epithelium and photoreceptors, but investigating its flow and anatomy remains challenging with many non-invasive methods. LDH has been reported to provide flow contrast in choroidal vessels in humans and to support functional analysis of ocular hemodynamics in the posterior pole. Improved choroidal flow visualization is of interest for disorders in which choroidal circulation and outflow pathways (e.g. via vortex veins) may be implicated, including the pachychoroid disease spectrum.

Beyond flow magnitude, LDH methods have also been developed to infer the local direction of blood flow with respect to the optical axis in out-of-plane vessels, enabling direction-encoded maps and improving vessel-topology interpretation in the fundus.

=== Measurement of surface waves on the skin ===
Holographic photoplethysmogram: laser Doppler holography of pulse waves on the surface of the hand.

LDH can also be used to measure pulse-related dynamics at the skin surface (a holographic form of photoplethysmography) by analyzing optical fluctuations over time. In some demonstrations, temporal demodulation based on principal component analysis of reconstructed holograms has been used to separate physiological dynamics from static backgrounds and noise.

A general overview of laser Doppler holography (principles and applications) is available on an informational project site.

Related Wikipedia coverage: laser Doppler holography is also discussed in articles such as Microangiography (as a microangiography modality) and Photoplethysmogram (in the context of remote pulse-wave monitoring).

== Use in obstetrics and gynaecology ==
LDI has been used as a non-contact method to assess genital blood flow responses in research settings; signals are reported from shallow tissue depths and described as measures of vasocongestion. Studies have evaluated its validity for differentiating arousal-related responses from non-arousal states in controlled protocols.

== Limitations ==
Commonly reported limitations include:

- sensitivity to motion (patient motion and probe motion can introduce strong artifacts);
- dependence on tissue optical properties and geometry, complicating absolute quantification;
- limited depth selectivity (signals integrate over a superficial sampling volume) and susceptibility to multiple scattering;
- confounding by temperature, pressure, and vasoactive state in skin protocols.

== See also ==
- Laser Doppler flowmetry
- Laser speckle contrast imaging
- Digital holography
- Holography
- Interferometry
- Microangiography
- Optical coherence tomography angiography
- Photoplethysmogram
