= Vascular resistance =

Force from blood vessels that affects blood flow

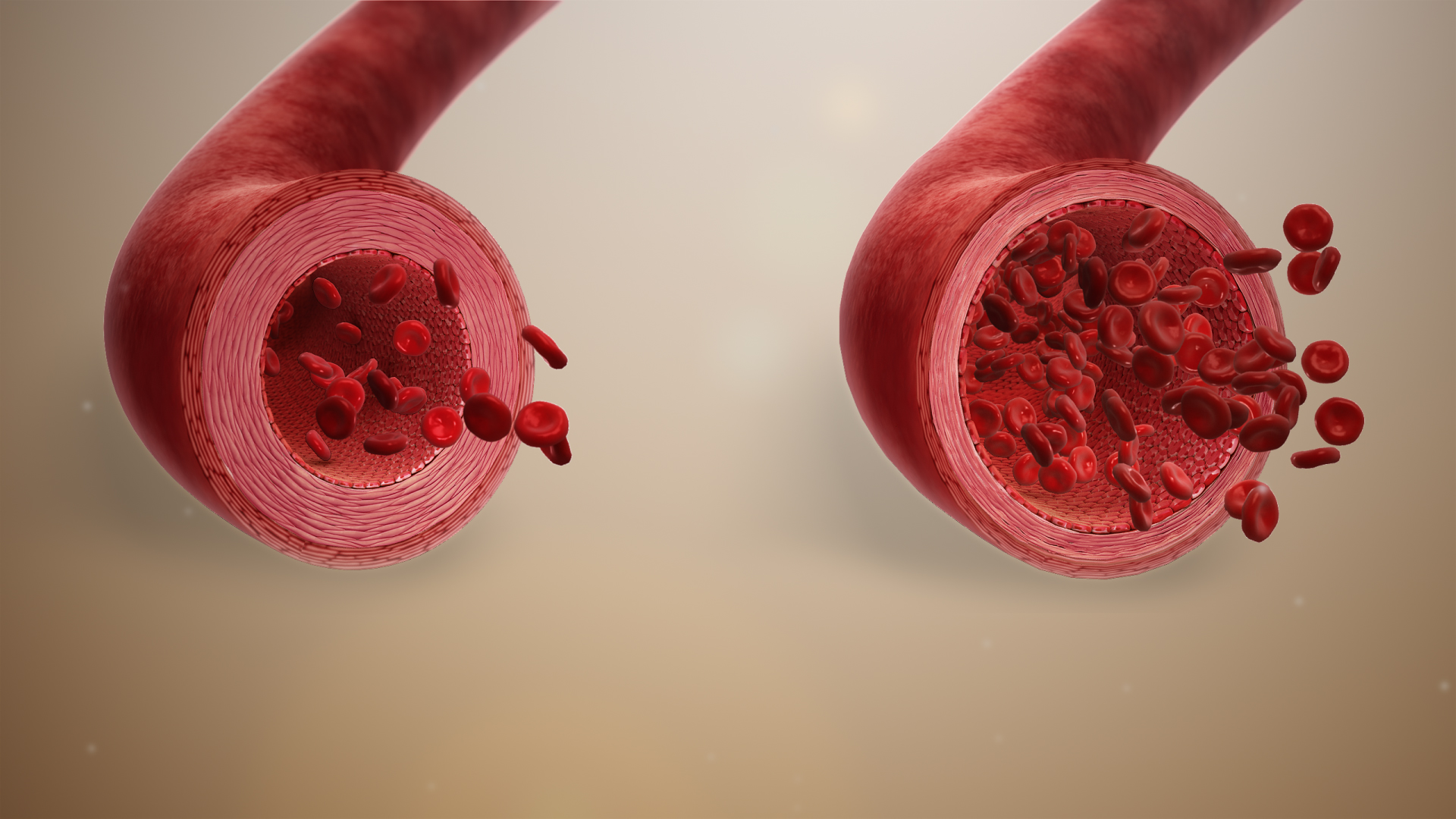
Vasoconstriction increases resistance, whereas vasodilation decreases resistance.

Vascular resistance is the resistance that must be overcome for blood to flow through the circulatory system. The resistance offered by the systemic circulation is known as the systemic vascular resistance or may sometimes be called by another term total peripheral resistance, while the resistance caused by the pulmonary circulation is known as the pulmonary vascular resistance. Vasoconstriction (i.e., decrease in the diameter of arteries and arterioles) increases resistance, whereas vasodilation (increase in diameter) decreases resistance. Blood flow and cardiac output are related to blood pressure and inversely related to vascular resistance.

== Measurement ==
The measurement of vascular resistance is challenging in most situations. The standard method is by the use of a pulmonary artery catheter. This is common in ICU settings but impractical in most other settings.

== Units for measuring ==
Units for measuring vascular resistance are dyn·s·cm^{−5}, pascal seconds per cubic metre (Pa·s/m^{3}) or, for ease of deriving it by pressure (measured in mmHg) and cardiac output (measured in L/min), it can be given in mmHg·min/L. This is numerically equivalent to hybrid resistance units (HRU), also known as Wood units (in honor of Paul Wood, an early pioneer in the field), frequently used by pediatric cardiologists. The conversion between these units is:

$1\, \frac{\text{mmHg} \cdot \text{min}}{\text{ L }} (\text{HRUs}) = 8\, \frac{\text{MPa} \cdot \text{s}}{\text{m}^3} = 80\, \frac{\text{dyn} \cdot \text{sec}}{\text{cm}^5}$

Measurement	Reference range		
Measurement	dyn·s/cm^{5}	MPa·s/m^{3}	mmHg·min/L or HRU, aka Wood units
Systemic vascular resistance	700–1600	70–160	9–20
Pulmonary vascular resistance	20–130	2–13	0.25–1.6

== Calculation ==
In the hydraulic version of Ohm's law, sometimes called Ohm’s law of fluid flow, vascular resistance is analogous to electrical resistance, the pressure difference is analogous to the electrical voltage difference, and volumetric flow is analogous to electric current flow:

$$R = \Delta P / Q$$

where

- R is resistance
- ΔP is the difference in pressure across the circulation loop (systemic / pulmonary) from its beginning (immediately after exiting the left ventricle / right ventricle) to its end (entering the right atrium / left atrium)
- Q is the flow through the vasculature (when discussing SVR this is equal to cardiac output)

=== Systemic vascular resistance ===
The SVR can therefore be calculated in units of dyn·s·cm^{−5} as

$$\frac {80 \cdot (\mathrm{mean\ arterial\ pressure} - \mathrm{mean \ right \ atrial \ pressure})} {\mathrm{cardiac\ output}}$$

where the pressures are measured in mmHg and the cardiac output is measured in units of litres per minute (L/min). Mean arterial pressure is the cycle average of blood pressure and is commonly approximated as 2 x diastolic blood pressure + systolic blood pressure/3 [or diastolic blood pressure + 1/3(systolic blood pressure - diastolic blood pressure)]. Mean right atrial pressure or central venous pressure, is usually very low (normally around 4mmHg), and as a result, it is frequently disregarded.

As an example: if systolic blood pressure = 120 mmHg, diastolic blood pressure = 80 mmHg, right atrial mean pressure = 3 mmHg and cardiac output = 5 L/min, Then mean arterial pressure = 2 x diastolic pressure + systolic pressure/3 = 93.3 mmHg, and SVR = (93 - 3) / 5 = 18 Wood units, or equivalently 1440 dyn·s/cm^{5}.

It is difficult to measure or monitor SVR in most locations outside the ICU. An invasive catheter is necessary. SVR, BP and CO are related to each other but only BP is easily measured. In the typical situation at the bedside we have an equation with three variables, one known, that is the BP and two unknown, CO and SVR. For this reason the BP is frequently used as a practical but somewhat inadequate definition of shock or the state of blood flow.

=== Pulmonary vascular resistance ===
The PVR can be calculated similarly (in units of dyn·s·cm^{−5} ) as:

$$\frac {80 \cdot (\mathrm{mean\ pulmonary\ arterial\ pressure} - \mathrm{mean \ pulmonary \ artery \ wedge \ pressure})} {\mathrm{cardiac\ output}}$$

where the units of measurement are the same as for SVR. The pulmonary artery wedge pressure (also called pulmonary artery occlusion pressure or PAOP) is a measurement in which one of the pulmonary arteries is occluded, and the pressure downstream from the occlusion is measured in order to approximate the left atrial pressure. Therefore, the numerator of the above equation is the pressure difference between the input to the pulmonary blood circuit (where the heart's right ventricle connects to the pulmonary trunk) and the output of the circuit (which is the input to the left atrium of the heart).

== Regulation ==
There are many factors that influence vascular resistance. Vascular compliance is determined by the muscle tone in the smooth muscle tissue of the tunica media and the elasticity of the elastic fibers there, but the muscle tone is subject to continual homeostatic changes by hormones and cell signaling molecules that induce vasodilation and vasoconstriction to keep blood pressure and blood flow within reference ranges.

In a first approach, based on fluids dynamics (where the flowing material is continuous and made of continuous atomic or molecular bonds, the internal friction happen between continuous parallel layers of different velocities) factors that influence vascular resistance are represented in an adapted form of the Hagen–Poiseuille equation:

$$R = \frac{8 L \eta} {\pi r^4}$$

where

- R = resistance to blood flow
- L = length of the vessel
- η = viscosity of blood
- r = radius of the blood vessel

Vessel length is generally not subject to change in the body.

In Hagen–Poiseuille equation, the flow layers start from the wall and, by viscosity, reach each other in the central line of the vessel following a parabolic velocity profile.

In a second approach, more realistic and coming from experimental observations on blood flows, according to Thurston, there is a plasma release-cell layering at the walls surrounding a plugged flow. It is a fluid layer in which at a distance δ, viscosity η is a function of δ written as η(δ), and these surrounding layers do not meet at the vessel centre in real blood flow. Instead, there is the plugged flow which is hyperviscous because holding high concentration of RBCs. Thurston assembled this layer to the flow resistance to describe blood flow by means of a viscosity η(δ) and thickness δ from the wall layer.

The blood resistance law appears as R adapted to blood flow profile :

$R = \frac{c L \eta(\delta)}{\pi \delta r^3}$

where

- R = resistance to blood flow
- c = constant coefficient of flow
- L = length of the vessel
- η(δ) = viscosity of blood in the wall plasma release-cell layering
- r = radius of the blood vessel
- δ = distance in the plasma release-cell layer

Blood resistance varies depending on blood viscosity and its plugged flow (or sheath flow since they are complementary across the vessel section) size as well, and on the size of the vessels.

Blood viscosity increases as blood is more hemoconcentrated, and decreases as blood is more dilute. The greater the viscosity of blood, the larger the resistance will be. In the body, blood viscosity increases as red blood cell concentration increases, thus more hemodilute blood will flow more readily, while more hemoconcentrated blood will flow more slowly.

Counteracting this effect, decreased viscosity in a liquid results in the potential for increased turbulence. Turbulence can be viewed from outside of the closed vascular system as increased resistance, thereby countering the ease of flow of more hemodilute blood. Turbulence, particularly in large vessels, may account for some pressure change across the vascular bed.

The major regulator of vascular resistance in the body is regulation of vessel radius. In humans, there is very little pressure change as blood flows from the aorta to the large arteries, but the small arteries and arterioles are the site of about 70% of the pressure drop, and are the main regulators of SVR. When environmental changes occur (e.g. exercise, immersion in water), neuronal and hormonal signals, including binding of norepinephrine and epinephrine to the α1 receptor on vascular smooth muscles, cause either vasoconstriction or vasodilation. Because resistance is inversely proportional to the fourth power of vessel radius, changes to arteriole diameter can result in large increases or decreases in vascular resistance.

If the resistance is inversely proportional to the fourth power of vessel radius, the resulting force exerted on the wall vessels, the parietal drag force, is inversely proportional to the second power of the radius. The force exerted by the blood flow on the vessel walls is, according to the Poiseuille equation, the wall shear stress. This wall shear stress is proportional to the pressure drop. The pressure drop is applied on the section surface of the vessel, and the wall shear stress is applied on the sides of the vessel. So the total force on the wall is proportional to the pressure drop and the second power of the radius. Thus the force exerted on the wall vessels is inversely proportional to the second power of the radius.

The blood flow resistance in a vessel is mainly regulated by the vessel radius and viscosity when blood viscosity too varies with the vessel radius. According to very recent results showing the sheath flow surrounding the plug flow in a vessel, the sheath flow size is not neglectible in the real blood flow velocity profile in a vessel. The velocity profile is directly linked to flow resistance in a vessel. The viscosity variations, according to Thurston, are also balanced by the sheath flow size around the plug flow. The secondary regulators of vascular resistance, after vessel radius, is the sheath flow size and its viscosity.

Thurston, as well, shows that the resistance R is constant, where, for a defined vessel radius, the value η(δ)/δ is constant in the sheath flow.

Vascular resistance depends on blood flow which is divided into 2 adjacent parts : a plug flow, highly concentrated in RBCs, and a sheath flow, more fluid plasma release-cell layering. Both coexist and have different viscosities, sizes and velocity profiles in the vascular system.

Combining Thurston's work with the Hagen-Poiseuille equation shows that blood flow exerts a force on vessel walls which is inversely proportional to the radius and the sheath flow thickness. It is proportional to the mass flow rate and blood viscosity.

$F = \frac{Q c L \eta(\delta)}{\pi \delta r}$

where

- F = Force exerted by blood flow on vessel walls
- Q = Volumetric flow rate
- c = constant coefficient of flow
- L = length of the vessel
- η(δ) = dynamic viscosity of blood in the wall plasma release-cell layering
- r = radius of the blood vessel
- δ = distance in the plasma release-cell layer or sheath flow thickness

=== Other factors ===
Many of the platelet-derived substances, including serotonin, are vasodilatory when the endothelium is intact and are vasoconstrictive when the endothelium is damaged.

Cholinergic stimulation causes release of endothelium-derived relaxing factor (EDRF) (later it was discovered that EDRF was nitric oxide) from intact endothelium, causing vasodilation. If the endothelium is damaged, cholinergic stimulation causes vasoconstriction.

Adenosine most likely does not play a role in maintaining the vascular resistance in the resting state. However, it causes vasodilation and decreased vascular resistance during hypoxia. Adenosine is formed in the myocardial cells during hypoxia, ischemia, or vigorous work, due to the breakdown of high-energy phosphate compounds (e.g., adenosine monophosphate, AMP). Most of the adenosine that is produced leaves the cell and acts as a direct vasodilator on the vascular wall. Because adenosine acts as a direct vasodilator, it is not dependent on an intact endothelium to cause vasodilation.

Adenosine causes vasodilation in the small and medium-sized resistance arterioles (less than 100 μm in diameter). When adenosine is administered it can cause a coronary steal phenomenon, where the vessels in healthy tissue dilate more than diseased vessels. When this happens blood is shunted from potentially ischemic tissue that can now become ischemic tissue. This is the principle behind adenosine stress testing. Adenosine is quickly broken down by adenosine deaminase, which is present in red cells and the vessel wall. The coronary steal and the stress test can be quickly terminated by stopping the adenosine infusion.

== Systemic ==
A decrease in SVR (e.g., during exercising) will result in an increased flow to tissues and an increased venous flow back to the heart. An increased SVR, as occurs with some medications, will decrease flow to tissues and decrease venous flow back to the heart. Vasoconstriction and an increased SVR is particularly true of drugs the stimulate alpha(1) adrenergic receptors.

== Pulmonary ==
The major determinant of vascular resistance is small arteriolar (known as resistance arterioles) tone. These vessels are from 450 μm down to 100 μm in diameter (as a comparison, the diameter of a capillary is about 5 to 10 μm). Another determinant of vascular resistance is the pre-capillary arterioles. These arterioles are less than 100 μm in diameter. They are sometimes known as autoregulatory vessels since they can dynamically change in diameter to increase or reduce blood flow.

Any change in the viscosity of blood (such as due to a change in hematocrit) would also affect the measured vascular resistance.

Pulmonary vascular resistance (PVR) also depends on the lung volume, and PVR is lowest at the functional residual capacity (FRC). The highly compliant nature of the pulmonary circulation means that the degree of lung distention has a large effect on PVR. This results primarily due to effects on the alveolar and extra-alveolar vessels. During inspiration, increased lung volumes cause alveolar expansion and lengthwise stretching of the interstitial alveolar vessels. This increases their length and reduces their diameter, thus increasing alveolar vessel resistance. On the other hand, decreased lung volumes during expiration cause the extra-alveolar arteries and veins to become narrower due to decreased radial traction from adjacent tissues. This leads to an increase in extra-alveolar vessel resistance. PVR is calculated as a sum of the alveolar and extra-alveolar resistances as these vessels lie in series with each other. Because the alveolar and extra-alveolar resistances are increased at high and low lung volumes respectively, the total PVR takes the shape of a U curve. The point at which PVR is the lowest is near the FRC.

== Coronary ==
The regulation of tone in the coronary arteries is a complex subject. There are a number of mechanisms for regulating coronary vascular tone, including metabolic demands (i.e. hypoxia), neurologic control, and endothelial factors (i.e. EDRF, endothelin).

Local metabolic control (based on metabolic demand) is the most important mechanism of control of coronary flow. Decreased tissue oxygen content and increased tissue CO_{2} content act as vasodilators. Acidosis acts as a direct coronary vasodilator and also potentiates the actions of adenosine on the coronary vasculature.

== See also ==
- Arterial resistivity index
- Hemodynamics
- Blood pressure
- Adenosine
- Perfusion
- Cardiac output
- Vasoconstriction
- Vasodilation
