= Mikito Takayasu =

Japanese ophthalmologist (1860–1938)

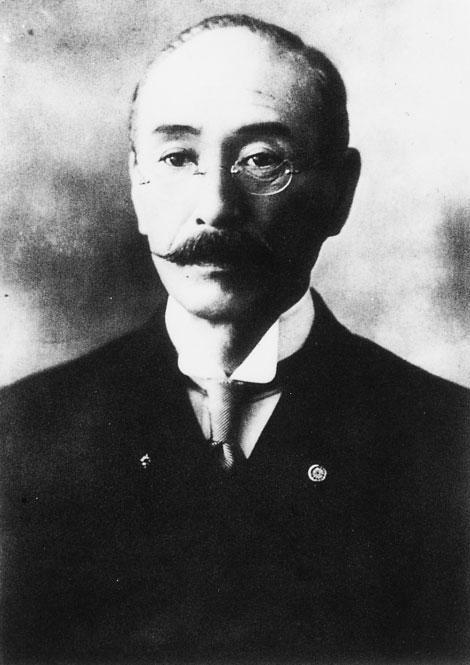
Takayasu, c. 1910

Mikito Takayasu (高安 右人; (1860–1938)) was a Japanese ophthalmologist known for his discovery of Takayasu's arteritis.

He graduated from Tokyo Imperial University in 1887 and worked at what was to become Kanazawa University School of Medicine in Kanazawa, Ishikawa. After moving to Beppu, Kyushu he died in November 1938.
