= Arterial resistivity index =

- Arterial resistivity index (right) from retinal laser Doppler imaging (left).
- Purpose: measure of pulsatile blood flow

The arterial resistivity index (also called as Resistance index, abbreviated as RI), developed by Léandre Pourcelot , is a measure of pulsatile blood flow that reflects the resistance to blood flow caused by microvascular bed distal to the site of measurement. It is primarily used in ultrasound imaging to evaluate arteries and solid organ damage.

== Calculation ==
The formula used to calculate resistance index is:

$$RI = \frac{v_{systole} - v_{diastole}}{v_{systole}}$$

== Description ==
Resistance index	Description
0	Continuous flow
1	Systolic flow, but no diastolic flow
>1	Reversed diastolic flow

The RI is altered not by vascular resistance alone but by the combination of vascular resistance and vascular compliance.

Normal mean renal artery RI for an adult is 0.6 with 0.7 the upper limit of normal. In children, RI commonly exceeds 0.7 through 12 months of age and can remain above 0.7 through 4 years of age.

== Medical uses ==
It is used in ultrasound testing of umbilical artery for placental insufficiency. RI should not exceed 0.60 at 30 weeks of gestation.

It is also used to assess the kidneys for medical renal disease, as can occur with diabetes or kidney transplants damaged by rejection. Following kidney transplantation, patients with an RI > 0.8 have an increased mortality.

Mapping of the local arterial resistivity index from laser Doppler imaging enables unambiguous identification of retinal arteries and veins on the basis of their systole-diastole variations, and reveal ocular hemodynamics in human eyes.

== See also ==
- Pulsatility index
- Leandre Pourcelot (French)
