= Laser speckle contrast imaging =

Laser speckle contrast imaging (LSCI), also called laser speckle imaging (LSI), is an imaging modality based on the analysis of the blurring effect of the speckle pattern. The operation of LSCI is having a wide-field illumination of a rough surface through a coherent light source. Then using photodetectors such as CCD camera or CMOS sensors imaging the resulting laser speckle pattern caused by the interference of coherent light. In biomedical use, the coherent light is typically in the red or near-infrared region to ensure higher penetration depth. When scattering particles moving during the time, the interference caused by the coherent light will have fluctuations which will lead to the intensity variations detected via the photodetector, and this change of the intensity contain the information of scattering particles' motion. Through image the speckle patterns with finite exposure time, areas with scattering particles will appear blurred.

== Development ==
The first practical application of utilizing speckle pattern reduction to mapping retinal blood flow was reported by Fercher and Briers in 1982. This technology was called single-exposure speckle photography at that time. Due to the lacking of sufficient digital techniques in the 1980s, single-exposure speckle photography has a two-step process which made it not convenient and efficient enough for biomedical research especially in clinical use. With the development of digital techniques, including the CCD cameras, CMOS sensors, and computers, in the 1990s, Briers and Webster successfully improved single-exposure speckle photography. It no longer needed to use photographs to capture images. The improved technology is called laser speckle contrast imaging (LSCI) which can directly measure the contrast of speckle pattern. A typical instrumental setup of laser speckle contrast imaging only contains a laser source, camera, diffuser, lens, and computer. Due to the simple structure of the instrumental setup, LSCI can be integrated into other systems easily.

== Concept ==
=== Speckle theory ===
==== Contrast ====
For a fully developed speckle pattern which formed when the complete coherent and polarized light illuminate a static medium, the contrast (K) range from 0 to 1 is defined by the ratio between the standard deviation and mean intensity:

$K=\frac{\sigma}{\langle I \rangle}$

The intensity distribution of the speckle pattern will be used to compute the contrast value.

==== Autocorrelation functions ====
Autocorrelation functions of electric field are used to measure the relationship between contrast and the motion of scatterers because the intensity fluctuations are produced by electric field changes of scatterers. E(t) is the electric field over time, E* is the complex conjugate of electric field and $\tau$ is the autocorrelation delay time.

$g_1(\tau)=\frac{\langle E(t)\cdot E^*(t+\tau)\rangle}{\langle E(t)\cdot E^*(t) \rangle}$

Bandyopadhyay et al. showed that the reduced intensity variances of speckle pattern are related to $g_1$. Therefore, the contrast can be written as

$K(T)^2 = \frac{2\beta}{T}\int\limits_{0}^{T} |g_1(\tau)|^2 \left ( 1- \frac{\tau}{T} \right ) \mathrm d\tau$

where T is the exposure time. The normalization constant $\beta$ takes into account the loss of correlation due to the detector pixel size, and depolarization of the light through the medium.

==== Motion Distributions ====
Dynamic scatterers' motion can be classified into two categories, one is the ordered motion and the other one is disordered motion. The ordered motion is the ordered flow of scattered while the disordered motion is caused by the temperature effects. The total dynamic scatterers' motions were thought of as Brownian motion historically, the approximate velocity distribution of Brownian motion can be considered as the Lorentzian profile. However, the ordered motion in dynamic scatterers follows Gaussian distribution. When considering the motion distribution, the contrast equation related to the autocorrelation can be updated. The updated equations are as follows, $K^L$ is the contrast equation function in Lorentzian profile and $K^G$ is the contrast equation function in Gaussian profile. $\tau$ is the decorrelation time. Both equations can be used in contrast measurement, some scientists also use contrast equations with the combination of them. However, what the correct theoretical contrast equation should be is still under investigation.

$$K^L(T)^2=\beta\begin{bmatrix} \frac{\tau_{cl}}{T}+\frac{(\tau_{cl})^2}{2T^2}(e^{-2T/\tau_{cl}}-1) \end{bmatrix}$$

$$K^G(T)^2=\beta\begin{bmatrix} {\frac{\tau_{cg}}{T}}\sqrt{\frac{\pi}{2}} \mathrm{erf} (\sqrt{2}T/\tau_{cg})+{\frac{\tau_{cg}^2}{2T^2}}(e^{-2T^2/\tau_{cg}^2}-1) \end{bmatrix}$$

==== Normalization constants ====
$\beta$ is the normalization constants that vary in different LSCI systems, the value of it is $\leq$ 1, the most common method to determine the value of it is using the following equation. $\beta$ is account for the instability and maximum contrast of each LSCI system.

$\beta=\lim_{T \to 0}K(T)$

==== Effect of static scatterers ====
Static scatterers are present in the assessed sample, speckle contrast produced by static scatterers remains constant. By adding statics scatterers, the contrast equation can be updated again.

$K(T)^2 = \frac{2\beta}{T}\int\limits_{0}^{T} P_1^2|g_1(\tau)|^2 \left ( 1- \frac{\tau}{T} \right )P_2^2 \mathrm d\tau$

*The above equation did not account for the motion distributions.

P1 and P2 are two constants that range from 0 to 1, they are determined by fitting this equation to the actual experimental data.

==== Scatterers velocity determination ====
The relationship between the velocity of scatterers and decorrelation time is as follows, velocity of scatterers such as the blood flow is proportional to the decorrelation time, $\lambda$ is the laser light wavelength.

$V=\frac{\lambda}{2\pi \tau_c}$

=== Contrast processing algorithm ===
The method to compute the contrast of speckle patterns can be classified into three categories: s-K (spatial), t-K (temporal), and st-K (Spatio-temporal). To compute the spatial contrast, raw images of laser speckle will be separated into small elements, and each element corresponds to a $n\times n$ pixels. The value of $n$ is determined by the speckle size. The intensity of all the pixels in each element will be summed and averaged to return a mean intensity value (μ), the final contrast value of this element will be calculated based on the mean intensity and actual intensity of each pixel. To improve the resolution limitation, scientists also compute the temporal contrast of the speckle pattern. The method is the same as how to compute spatial contrast but just in temporal. The combination computation of spatial contrast and temporal contrast is Spatio-temporal contrast processing algorithm and this is the most commonly used one.

=== Practical considerations ===
- Several parameters should take into considerations to maximum contrast and signal to noise ratio (SNR) of LSCI. The size of individual speckle is essential and it will determine the requirement of the photodetector. The size of each speckle pattern should smaller than the photodetector's pixel size to avoid the decrease of contrast. The minimum speckle diameter for an LSCI system depends on the wavelength of light, imaging system magnification, and imaging system f-number: $d_\min\thickapprox 1.2(1+M)\lambda f/\#$
- Measurement of normalization constant $\beta$, static scatters is necessary, as they can determine the maximum contrast the LSCI system can obtained.
- Both too short or too long exposure time (T) can decrease the efficiency of the LSCI system as too short exposure can not ensure the adequate photons to be accumulated while too long exposure time can reduce contrast. Suitable T should be analyzed in advance.
- The illumination angle should be considered to achieve higher light transmittance efficiency.
- Suitable laser source should be chosen to get rid of a decrease in contrast and SNR.

== Applications ==
Compared with other existing imaging technologies, laser speckle contrast imaging has several obvious advantages. It can use simple and cost-effective instruments to return excellent spatial and temporal resolution imaging. And due to these strengths, laser speckle contrast imaging has been involved in mapping blood flow for decades. The use of LSCI has been extended to many subjects in the biomedical field which include but are not limited to rheumatology, burns, dermatology, neurology, gastrointestinal tract surgery, dentistry, cardiovascular research. LSCI can be adopted into another system easily for clinical full-field monitoring, measuring, and investigating living processes in almost real-time scale.

However, LSCI still has some limitations, it can only be used to mapping relative blood flow instead of measuring the absolute blood flow. Due to the complex vascular anatomy structure, the maximum detection depth of LSCI is limited by 900 micrometers now. The scattering and absorption effect of red blood cell can influence the contrast value. The complex physics of measuring behind this technology made it hard to do quantitative measurements.
