= Microangiography =

- Purpose: radiography of small blood or lymphatic vessel

Microangiography (/ˌmaɪkroʊˌændʒiˈɒɡrəfi/ MY-kroh-AN-jee-OG-rə-fee) is a type of angiography that consists of the radiography of small blood or lymphatic vessels of an organ. While most other types of angiography cannot produce images of vessels smaller than 200 μm in diameter, microangiography does just that. A microangiographic image is the result of injection of a contrast medium into either the blood or the lymphatic system and, then, enlargement of the resulting radiograph. Thus, an image is obtained in which there is contrast between vessel and surrounding tissue. It is often used in order to detect microvascular lesions in organs. But, it has been suggested that microangiography can also be used to detect tumors through visualization of tumor-induced small blood vessels. This is because tumor growths require vascularization before they can develop more rapidly. A few of the commonly used types are fluorescent, silicone rubber, and synchrotron radiation microangiography.

== Common types ==
=== Fluorescent microangiography ===
Also known as FMA, fluorescent microangiography is used to visualize and quantify changes in microvasculature. It is different from other types of microangiography in that a fluorescent marker or contrast medium is used instead of something else. Fluorescein and indocyanine green are often used for this purpose.

=== Laser Doppler holography ===
Laser Doppler imaging by digital holography reveals retinal blood flow non invasively in the eye fundus.

Computational imaging with lasers, ultrahigh-speed cameras, commodity graphics cards, and state-of-the-art statistical filtering algorithms, emerges as a competitive alternative to dye angiographies. This class of non-invasive microangiography techniques can be advantageously applied to the eye fundus to reveal endoluminal blood flow profiles in the retina and choroid. Laser Doppler imaging by holography provides high-contrast visualization of local blood flow in choroidal vessels in humans, with a spatial resolution comparable to state-of-the-art indocyanine green angiography.

=== Silicone rubber microangiography ===
This type of microangiography produces a three-dimensional image that depicts the distribution of vasculature in a tissue. It is commonly used to determine changes in microvasculature.

=== Synchrotron radiation microangiography ===
This type of microangiography uses monochromatic synchrotron radiation and a high-definition video system to provide an image of small collateral arteries with a diameter less than 100 μm.

== See also ==
- Computed Tomography Angiography
- Intravenous digital subtraction angiography
