= Digital holography =

Imaging technique

Digital holography is the acquisition and processing of holograms from a digital sensor array, typically a CCD camera or a similar device, and also refers to the display of holograms using a digital output device such as a spatial light modulator. Image rendering, or reconstruction of object data is performed numerically from digitized interferograms. Digital holography offers a means of measuring optical phase data and typically delivers three-dimensional surface or optical thickness images. Several recording and processing schemes have been developed to assess optical wave characteristics such as amplitude, phase, and polarization state, which make digital holography a very powerful method for metrology applications .

== Digital recording and processing of holograms ==
=== Off-axis configuration ===
In the off-axis configuration, a small angle between the reference and the object beams is used to prevent overlapping of the cross-beating contributions between the object and reference optical fields with the self-beating contributions of these fields. These discoveries were made by Emmett Leith and Juris Upatnieks for analog holography, and subsequently adapted to digital holography. In this configuration, only a single recorded digital interferogram is required for image reconstruction. Yet, this configuration can also be used in conjunction with temporal modulation methods, such as phase-shifting and frequency-shifting for high sensitivity measurements in low light.

=== Phase-shifting holography ===
The phase-shifting (or phase-stepped) digital holography process entails capturing multiple interferograms that each indicate the optical phase relationships between light returned from all points on the illuminated object and a controlled reference beam of light. The optical phase of the reference beam is shifted from one sampled interferogram to the next. From a linear combination of these interferograms, complex-valued holograms are formed. These holograms contain amplitude and phase information of the optical radiation diffracted by the object, in the sensor plane.

=== Frequency-shifting holography ===
Through the use of electro-optic modulators (Pockel cells) or acousto-optic modulators (Bragg cells), the reference laser beam can be frequency-shifted by a tunable quantity. This enables optical heterodyne detection, a frequency-conversion process aimed at shifting a given radiofrequency optical signal component in the sensor's temporal bandwidth. Frequency-shifted holograms can be used for narrowband laser Doppler imaging.

=== Multiplexing of holograms ===
Addressing simultaneously distinct domains of the temporal and spatial bandwidth of holograms was performed with success for angular, wavelength, space-division, polarization, and sideband multiplexing schemes. Digital holograms can be numerically multiplexed and demultiplexed for efficient storage and transmission. Amplitude and phase can be correctly recovered.

=== Super-resolution in Digital Holography ===
Super-resolution is possible by means of a dynamic phase diffraction grating for increasing synthetically the aperture of the CCD array. Super-localization of particles can be achieved by adopting an optics/data-processing co-design scheme.

=== Optical Sectioning in Digital Holography ===
Optical sectioning, also known as sectional image reconstruction, is the process of recovering a planar image at a particular axial depth from a three-dimensional digital hologram. Various mathematical techniques have been used to solve this problem, with inverse imaging among the most versatile.

=== Extending Depth-of-Focus by Digital Holography in Microscopy ===
By using the 3D imaging capability of Digital Holography in amplitude and phase it is possible to extend the depth of focus in microscopy.

=== Combining of holograms and interferometric microscopy ===
The digital analysis of a set of holograms recorded from different directions or with different direction of the reference wave allows the numerical emulation of an objective with large numerical aperture, leading to corresponding enhancement of the resolution. This technique is called interferometric microscopy.

=== Compressive holography ===
Compressive holography applies the principles of compressed sensing to the ill-posed inverse problem of recovering three-dimensional information from a single two-dimensional hologram. Introduced by Brady et al. in 2009, the method formulates digital holographic reconstruction as a regularized optimization in which a sparsity prior — typically total variation or an L1 norm in a transform domain — is enforced on the reconstructed volume. Because the forward propagation operator from a three-dimensional object to a two-dimensional sensor plane is severely under-determined, conventional back-propagation suffers from out-of-focus contamination and a twin-image term; the compressive formulation suppresses both by selecting, among the infinitely many solutions consistent with the recorded data, the one that is most compatible with the assumed signal model.

=== Differentiable holography ===
Differentiable holography refers to a class of methods in which the entire holographic imaging pipeline — illumination, propagation, sensor response, and reconstruction algorithm — is expressed as a differentiable computational graph and optimized end-to-end with gradient-based techniques. Implemented in automatic differentiation frameworks, the approach unifies model-based reconstruction, calibration of physical system parameters, and learnable priors within a single optimization loop. Unlike classical iterative phase retrieval, which assumes a fixed and accurately known forward model, differentiable holography treats system parameters as free variables that can be jointly recovered alongside the object, addressing the simulation-to-experiment gap that limits the accuracy of physics-based reconstruction in practice. Differentiable holography is regarded as a representative instance of the broader differentiable imaging paradigm, in which optics, sensors, and algorithms are jointly designed.

== See also ==
- Computer generated holography
- Digital holographic microscopy
- Holographic interferometry
- Holography
