= Arteritic anterior ischemic optic neuropathy =

- Specialty: Ophthalmology, rheumatology

Arteritic anterior ischemic optic neuropathy (arteritic AION, A-AION or AAION) is vision loss that occurs in giant cell arteritis (also known as temporal arteritis). Temporal arteritis is an inflammatory disease of medium-sized blood vessels that happens especially with advancing age. AAION occurs in about 15-20 percent of patients with temporal arteritis. Damage to the blood vessels supplying the optic nerves leads to insufficient blood supply (ischemia) to the nerve and subsequent optic nerve fiber death. Most cases of AAION result in nearly complete vision loss first to one eye. If the temporal arteritis is left untreated, the affected eye will likely suffer vision loss as well within 1–2 weeks. Arteritic AION (AAION) falls under the general category of anterior ischemic optic neuropathy (AION), which also includes non-arteritic AION (NAION). AAION is considered an eye emergency, immediate treatment is essential to rescue remaining vision.

== Symptoms and signs ==
Sudden visual loss is the most common symptom in AAION, and is most often accompanied by other symptoms of temporal arteritis: such as jaw claudication, scalp tenderness, unintentional weight loss, fatigue, myalgias and loss of appetite. A related disease called polymyalgia rheumatica has a 15 percent incidence of giant cell arteritis.

== Cause ==
AAION is almost always caused by temporal arteritis (also known as giant cell arteritis). In rare cases, AAION may be caused by other types of vasculitis, such as polyarteritis nodosa, systemic lupus erythematosus and herpes zoster. In AAION, the posterior ciliary artery becomes inflamed which results in a thrombotic occlusion of the main blood supply to the optic nerve head with a risk of visual loss in the affected eye or eyes.

== Diagnosis ==
Diagnosis is primarily made by examination by an ophthalmologist. The diagnosis may be suspected in people with visual loss or amaurosis fugax. AAION occurs in elderly and late middle-aged people. Certain blood tests are usually elevated which may help identify AAION as part of temporal arteritis: erythrocyte sedimentation rate (ESR) and C-reactive protein (CRP).

== Treatment ==
AAION requires urgent intervention with a very long course of corticosteroids to prevent further damage.
