= Rheumatology =

Medical speciality of inflammatory diseases

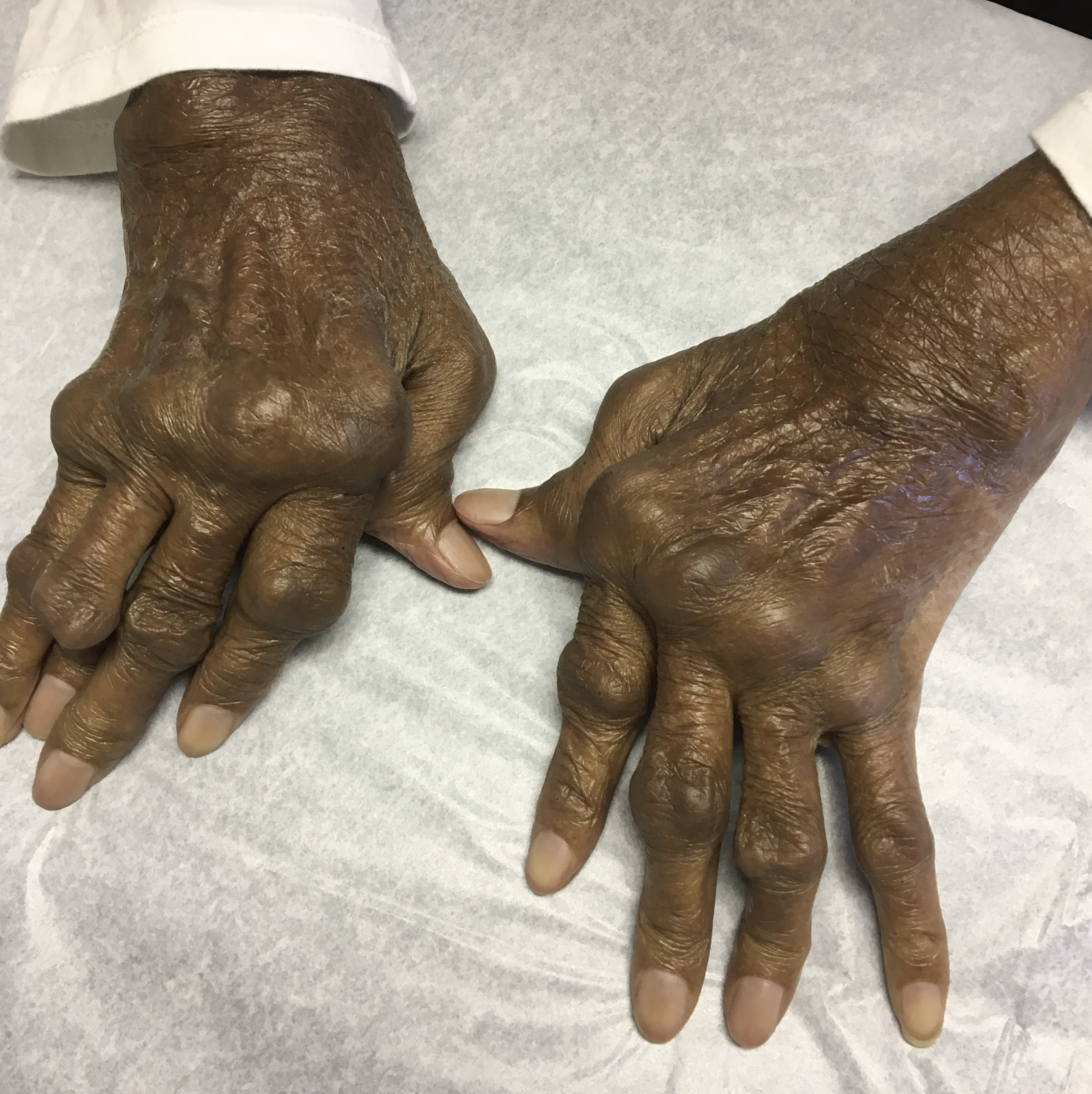
- Hands with rheumatoid arthritis, a common rheumatological disease
- System: Musculoskeletal, Immune
- Significant diseases: Autoimmune disease inflammation, rheumatoid arthritis, lupus, osteoarthritis, psoriatic arthritis, ankylosing spondylitis, gout, osteoporosis, polymyalgia rheumatica, giant cell arteritis,
- Significant tests: Joint aspirate, musculoskeletal exam, X-ray
- Specialist: Rheumatologist

Rheumatology (from Ancient Greek ῥεῦμα (rheûma) 'flowing current') is a branch of medicine devoted to the diagnosis and management of disorders of which the common feature is inflammation in the bones, muscles, joints, and internal organs. Rheumatology covers more than 100 different complex diseases, collectively known as rheumatic diseases, such as arthritis, lupus, and Sjögren's syndrome. Doctors who have undergone formal training in rheumatology are called rheumatologists.

Because many of these diseases are now known to be disorders of the immune system (such as autoimmune disorders), rheumatology has significant overlap with immunology, the branch of medicine that studies the immune system.

== Rheumatologist ==
Rheumatologist
Occupation
- Names: Doctor, Medical Specialist
- Occupation type: Specialty
- Activity sectors: Medicine

Description
- Education required: Doctor of Medicine (M.D.); Doctor of Osteopathic Medicine (D.O.); Bachelor of Medicine, Bachelor of Surgery (MBBS/MBChB)
- Fields of employment: Hospitals, Clinics

A rheumatologist is a physician who specializes in the field of medical sub-specialty called rheumatology. A rheumatologist holds a board certification after specialized training. In the United States, training in this field requires four years of undergraduate school, four years of medical school, and then three years of residency, followed by two or three years of additional Fellowship training. The requirements vary in other countries. Rheumatologists are internists who are qualified by additional postgraduate training and experience in the diagnosis and treatment of arthritis and other diseases of the joints, muscles, and bones. Many rheumatologists also conduct research to determine the cause and better treatments for these disabling and sometimes fatal diseases. Treatment modalities are based on scientific research, currently, the practice of rheumatology is largely evidence-based.

Rheumatologists treat arthritis, autoimmune diseases, pain disorders affecting joints, and osteoporosis. There are more than 200 types of these diseases, including rheumatoid arthritis, osteoarthritis, gout, lupus, back pain, osteoporosis, and tendinitis. Some of these are very serious diseases that can be difficult to diagnose and treat. They treat soft tissue problems related to the musculoskeletal system and sports-related soft tissue disorders.

Pediatric rheumatologist: A pediatric rheumatologist is a pediatrician who specializes in the treatment of children with rheumatic disease. Both specialties are important to address a child's milestone development and disease treatment throughout childhood. However, recognition of this sub-specialty has been slow, which has resulted in a global shortage of pediatric rheumatologists, and as a consequence, the demand for healthcare support far exceeds current service capacities. Raising awareness of this is important to attract more upcoming pediatricians into this rewarding area of healthcare.

== Diseases ==
Diseases diagnosed or managed by rheumatologists include:

=== Degenerative arthropathies ===
- Osteoarthritis

=== Inflammatory arthropathies ===
- Rheumatoid arthritis
- Spondyloarthropathies
  - Ankylosing spondylitis
  - Reactive arthritis (reactive arthropathy)
  - Psoriatic arthropathy
  - Enteropathic arthropathy
- Juvenile idiopathic arthritis (JIA)
- Crystal arthropathies: gout, pseudogout
- Septic arthritis
- Raynaud's Disease

=== Systemic conditions and connective tissue diseases ===
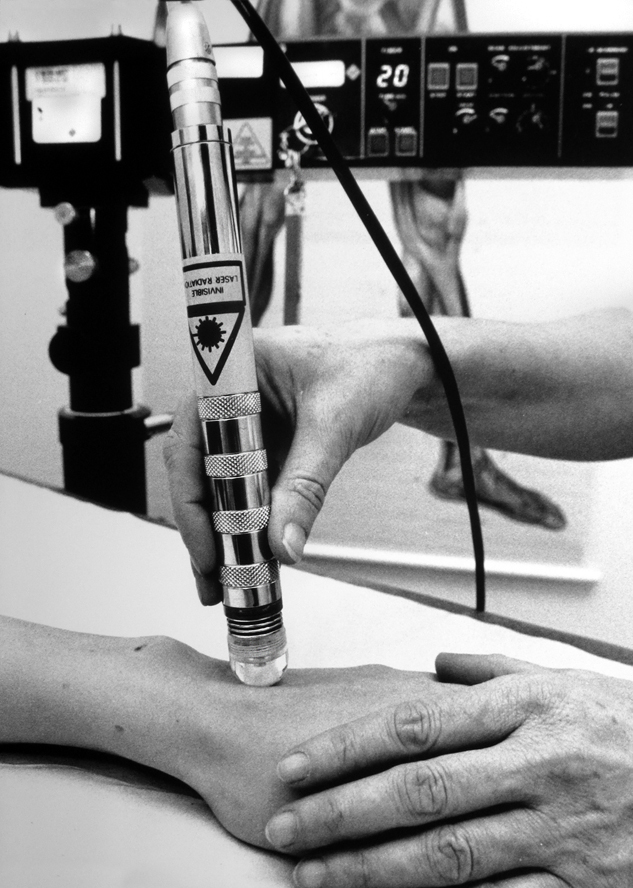
Medical laser for the treatment of rheumatism.

- Lupus
- Ehlers-Danlos syndrome
- Sjögren's syndrome
- Scleroderma (systemic sclerosis)
- Polymyositis
- Dermatomyositis
- Polymyalgia rheumatica
- Mixed connective tissue disease
- Relapsing polychondritis
- Adult-onset Still's disease
- Sarcoidosis
- Fibromyalgia
- Myofascial pain syndrome
- Vasculitis
  - Microscopic polyangiitis
  - Eosinophilic granulomatosis with polyangiitis
  - Granulomatosis with polyangiitis
  - Polyarteritis nodosa
  - Henoch–Schönlein purpura
  - Serum sickness
  - Giant cell arteritis, Temporal arteritis
  - Takayasu's arteritis
  - Behçet's disease
  - Kawasaki disease (mucocutaneous lymph node syndrome)
  - Thromboangiitis obliterans
- Hereditary periodic fever syndromes

=== Soft tissue rheumatism ===
Local diseases and lesions affecting the joints and structures around the joints including tendons, ligaments capsules, bursae, stress fractures, muscles, nerve entrapment, vascular lesions, and ganglia. For example:

- Low back pain
- Tennis elbow
- Golfer's elbow
- Olecranon bursitis

== Diagnosis ==
Synovial fluid examination
Type	WBC (per mm^{3})	% neutrophils	Viscosity	Appearance
Normal	<200	0	High	Transparent
Osteoarthritis	<5000	<25	High	Clear yellow
Trauma	<10,000	<50	Variable	Bloody
Inflammatory	2,000–50,000	50–80	Low	Cloudy yellow
Septic arthritis	>50,000	>75	Low	Cloudy yellow
Gonorrhea	~10,000	60	Low	Cloudy yellow
Tuberculosis	~20,000	70	Low	Cloudy yellow
Inflammatory: Gout, rheumatoid arthritis, rheumatic fever

=== Physical examination ===
Following are examples of methods of diagnosis able to be performed in a normal physical examination.

- Schober's test tests the flexion of the lower back.
- Multiple joint inspection
- Musculoskeletal Examination
  - Screening Musculoskeletal Exam (SMSE) - a rapid assessment of structure and function
  - General Musculoskeletal Exam (GMSE) - a comprehensive assessment of joint inflammation
  - Regional Musculoskeletal Exam (RMSE) - focused assessments of structure, function and inflammation combined with special testing

=== Specialized ===
- Laboratory tests (e.g. Erythrocyte Sedimentation Rate, Rheumatoid Factor, Anti-CCP (Anti-citrullinated protein antibody), ANA (Anti-Nuclear Antibody) )
- X-rays, Ultrasounds, and other imaging methods of affected joints
- Cytopathology and chemical pathology of fluid aspirated from affected joints (e.g. to differentiate between septic arthritis and gout)

== Treatment ==
Most rheumatic diseases are treated with analgesics, NSAIDs (nonsteroidal anti-inflammatory drug), steroids (in serious cases), DMARDs (disease-modifying antirheumatic drugs), monoclonal antibodies, such as infliximab and adalimumab, the TNF inhibitor etanercept, and methotrexate for moderate to severe rheumatoid arthritis. The biologic agent rituximab (anti-B cell therapy) is now licensed for use in refractory rheumatoid arthritis. Physiotherapy is vital in the treatment of many rheumatological disorders. Occupational therapy can help patients find alternative ways for common movements that would otherwise be restricted by their disease. Patients with rheumatoid arthritis often need a long term, coordinated and a multidisciplinary team approach towards management of individual patients. Treatment is often tailored according to the individual needs of each patient which is also dependent on the response and the tolerability of medications.

Beginning in the 2000s, the incorporation of biopharmaceuticals (which include inhibitors of TNF-alpha, certain interleukins, and the JAK-STAT signaling pathway) into standards of care is one of the paramount developments in modern rheumatology.

=== Rheumasurgery ===
Rheumasurgery (or rheumatoid surgery) is a subfield of orthopedics occupied with the surgical treatment of patients with rheumatic diseases. The purpose of the interventions is to limit disease activity, soothe pain and improve function.

Rheumasurgical interventions can be divided in two groups. The one is early synovectomies, that is the removal of the inflamed synovia in order to prevent spreading and stop destruction. The other group is the so-called corrective intervention, i.e. an intervention done after destruction has taken place. Among the corrective interventions are joint replacements, removal of loose bone or cartilage fragments, and a variety of interventions aimed at repositioning and/or stabilizing joints, such as arthrodesis.

== Research directions ==
Recently, a large body of scientific research deals with the background of autoimmune disease, the cause of many rheumatic disorders. Also, the field of osteoimmunology has emerged to further examine the interactions between the immune system, joints, and bones. Epidemiological studies and medication trials are also being conducted. The Rheumatology Research Foundation is the largest private funding source of rheumatology research and training in the United States.

== History ==
Rheumasurgery emerged in the cooperation of rheumatologists and orthopedic surgeons in Heinola, Finland, during the 1950s.

In 1970 a Norwegian investigation estimated that at least 50% of patients with rheumatic symptoms needed rheumasurgery as an integrated part of their treatment.

The European Rheumatoid Arthritis Surgical Society (ERASS) was founded in 1979.

Around the turn of the 21st century, focus for treatment of patients with rheumatic disease shifted, and pharmacological treatment became dominant, while surgical interventions became rarer.
