= Ischemic optic neuropathy =

Dysfunction of the optic nerve due to lack of blood flow

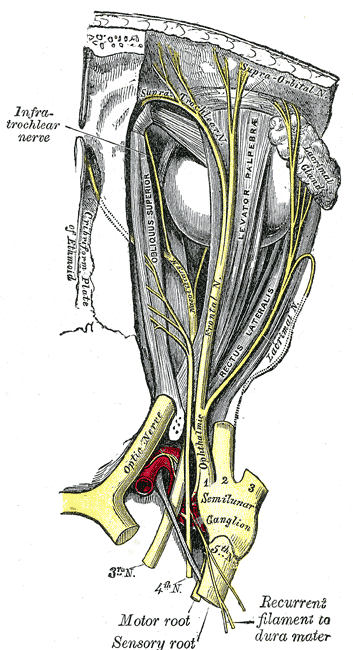
- Optic nerve
- Specialty: Ophthalmology

Ischemic optic neuropathy (ION) is the loss of structure and function of a portion of the optic nerve due to obstruction of blood flow to the nerve (i.e. ischemia). Ischemic forms of optic neuropathy are typically classified as either anterior ischemic optic neuropathy or posterior ischemic optic neuropathy according to the part of the optic nerve that is affected. People affected will often complain of a loss of visual acuity and a visual field, the latter of which is usually in the superior or inferior field.

When ION occurs in patients below the age of 50 years old, other causes should be considered, such as juvenile diabetes mellitus, antiphospholipid antibody-associated clotting disorders, collagen-vascular disease, and migraines. Rarely, complications of intraocular surgery or acute blood loss may cause an ischemic event in the optic nerve.

== Presentation ==
Anterior ION presents with sudden, painless visual loss, developing over hours to days.

== Diagnosis ==
Examination findings usually include decreased visual acuity, a visual field defect, color vision loss, a relative afferent pupillary defect, and a swollen optic nerve head. Posterior ION occurs arteritic, nonarteritic, and surgical settings. It is characterized by acute vision loss without initial disc edema, but with subsequent optic disc atrophy.

== Management ==
Although there is no recognized treatment that can reverse the visual loss, upon recent reports, optic nerve health decompression may be beneficial for a select group of patients with a gradual decline in vision due to ION.

== See also ==
- Ocular ischemic syndrome
