= Diabetic papillopathy =

- Other names: Diabetic papillitis
- Specialty: Ophthalmology
- Causes: Diabetes mellitus
- Diagnostic method: Fundus examination

Diabetic papillopathy (also known as diabetic papillitis) is a disease affecting the optic nerve of the eye. It is an ocular complication of diabetes mellitus characterized by optic disc swelling and edema of optic nerve head. The condition may affect both type 1 and type 2 diabetic patients.

== Presentation ==
Although there is optic disc edema, unlike other optic neuropathies, diabetic papillopathy is usually an asymptomatic eye disease. Signs of optic neuropathy such as a RAPD and dyschromatopsia are also absent. In rare cases, mild blurring of vision or mild visual field defects may occur.

== Pathophysiology ==
Diabetic papillopathy is a self-limiting disease that may affect both type 1 and type 2 diabetic patients. Unilateral or bilateral optic disc edema may occur. The exact etiology, pathogenesis and mechanism of the disc edema is unknown. Theories suggest that the dis edema is due to retinal vascular leakage into and surrounding the optic nerve and disruption of axoplasmic flow resulting from microvascular disease of the optic nerve head. Edema is seen in and around the optic nerve head also. Intraretinal hemorrhages and hard exudates may also be seen.

== Diagnosis ==
Currently accepted criteria for diagnosis of diabetic papillopathy include:

- Presence of diabetes mellitus (Appr. 70% type 1, 30% type 2)
- Optic disc edema (unilateral in 60% cases)
- Only mild optic nerve dysfunction

Disc edema is diagnosed by fundus examination using ophthalmoscopy or fundus photography. Fundus examination often reveals dilated telangiectatic vessels over the disc also.

=== Differential diagnosis ===
Diabetic papillopathy has many characteristics similar to Non-arteritic anterior ischemic optic neuropathy (NAION). Diabetic papillopathy is simultaneously bilateral and unlike AION, optic nerve function is not impaired in diabetic papillopathy. These are the two main clinical features that differentiate diabetic papillopathy from anterior ischemic optic neuropathy.

== Treatment ==
There is no validated therapy for diabetic papillopathy. The disc swelling usually resolve spontaneously within 4-8 weeks. Intravitreal corticosteroids or anti–vascular endothelial growth factor therapy may be advised in some cases.

== Epidemiology ==
Prevalence of diabetic papillopathy in diabetic patients is 1.4%. It occurs typically before the age of 30 in patients with good vision and mild non‐proliferative diabetic retinopathy.

== History ==
In 1971, Lubow and Makley first described the disorder as Pseudopapilledema in a patient with juvenile diabetes mellitus, which was further elaborated in three case series published in 1980.
