= Non-arteritic anterior ischemic optic neuropathy =

Medical condition from optic nerve damage

- Other names: NAION
- Specialty: Ophthalmology
- Symptoms: Optic disc swelling, optic atrophy, vision loss

Non-arteritic anterior ischemic optic neuropathy (NAION) is a medical condition characterized by loss of vision caused by damage to the optic nerve as a result of ischemia, or insufficient blood supply. The key symptom of NAION is optic disc swelling, which typically resolves within 2 months, but often leads to optic atrophy. The likelihood of vision improvement after developing this condition is low.

NAION is characterized by localized disruptions in blood flow to the optic nerve, often linked with broader systemic vascular conditions. Key risk factors include coronary artery disease, cerebrovascular disease, sleep apnea, diabetes, and hypertension. Currently, there is no universally accepted, scientifically proven treatment for NAION. However, there is a general consensus on the importance of managing underlying risk factors to prevent further complications. This includes controlling blood pressure, managing diabetes, and treating sleep apnea.

== Signs and symptoms ==
NAION usually presents suddenly as painless vision loss in one eye, often noticed upon waking up. The visual field defects can vary, and while some patients may experience immediate maximal vision loss, others may notice a gradual worsening. The optic disc in these cases can appear swollen, sometimes accompanied by hemorrhages. In some cases, there might be a phase where the disc appears swollen without immediate vision loss, potentially indicating a precursor to more severe damage.

NAION may present with color vision deficiency and a relative afferent pupillary defect. In NAION, the severity of color vision deficiency correlates with the level of loss of visual acuity.

Optical coherence tomography angiography effectively illustrates disruptions in microvascular blood flow within the retinal peripapillary capillaries and peripapillary choriocapillaries in individuals diagnosed with NAION. This method aids in visualizing minute vascular changes that are crucial for accurate diagnosis. Concurrently, magnetic resonance imaging (MRI) of the optic nerves plays a pivotal role in distinguishing NAION from optic neuritis, a condition with similar symptoms. Notably, MRI revealed optic nerve abnormalities in only a small fraction (15.6%) of NAION patients, compared to almost all (96.9%) patients with optic neuritis. Additionally, certain symptoms, including elevated swelling, paleness, narrower arteries, and hemorrhages, were more common in NAION than in optic neuritis.

The natural progression of NAION following acute vision loss typically includes an improvement in visual acuity by 3 or more lines on the Early Treatment Diabetic Retinopathy Study (ETDRS) chart in 43% of those not receiving treatment. As the initial swelling of the optic disc subsides, optic atrophy generally develops within one to two months after onset. A retrospective diagnosis of optic atrophy due to previous ischemic optic neuropathy is often possible when a small optic disc is detected in both the affected and the opposite eye, and when other tests for potential causes of optic atrophy yield normal results.

Following the ischemic damage to one optic disc, there exists a notable risk of involvement of the second eye. The recurrence rate of NAION in the same eye is approximately 6.4%. Data from the trial estimate this risk at about 15% over 5 years. In cases where the second eye also experiences NAION, there is no clear consensus regarding the correlation between the final visual outcomes.

== Causes ==
The underlying causes of NAION are largely unknown. Multiple theories suggest different mechanisms for the reduction in blood flow that triggers this condition, but there is no consensus on the precise cause of optic nerve damage.

=== "Disc-at-risk" ===
The term "disc-at-risk" refers to an optic nerve head characterized by a small cup-to-disc ratio and a crowding of optic nerve fibers. This anatomical feature is a significant factor in the development of NAION. Individuals predisposed to this condition typically have smaller optic discs with minimal or no cupping. This anatomical configuration leads to a congestion of nerve fibers, which can contribute to the onset of NAION. This mechanism is somewhat similar to compartment syndrome, where increased pressure within a confined space impairs blood flow and tissue function.

=== Optic nerve blood supply ===
The optic nerve head, or prelaminar disc, primarily receives blood from the peripapillary choroidal arterioles, which stem from the elliptical anastomotic annulus connected to the circle of Zinn-Haller. The circle of Zinn-Haller is formed by branches of the lateral and posterior ciliary arteries. Beyond this region, different segments of the optic nerve are supplied by various networks of arteries and capillaries originating from the ophthalmic artery and the central retinal artery. The Zinn-Haller circle also provides blood to the thin, sieve-like section of the eye's outer layer and the optic nerve fibers within it through small, inward-facing arteries. The area just behind this layer in the optic nerve is vascularized by small returning arteries and minute blood vessels that arise from the eye's surrounding circulation and the main ophthalmic artery, interweaving through the nerve's supporting fibers.

The parts of the optic nerve located within the eye socket and the canal it traverses receive blood from small arteries branching off the primary network surrounding the eye, as well as from the central retinal artery. Fluorescein angiographic studies have demonstrated that during the acute phase of NAION, there is a delay in blood flow to the optic disc, suggesting a potential impairment in the arteries directly supplying it. Other research indicates that a drop in blood pressure within specific critical areas of the optic disc's blood supply network may increase its susceptibility to damage.

There are debates over other potential causes such as nighttime drops in blood pressure, as well as the hypothesis that the optic disc's ability to regulate its blood flow may be compromised. Some researchers have even suggested that blockages in the veins could be responsible.

One hypothesis suggests that the underlying cause may be a subtle decrease in blood flow to the optic nerve, which is enough to cause swelling of the nerve fibers but not severe enough to disrupt vision through tissue death and permanent damage to the optic nerve. When considering the possible causes for spontaneous NAION, the list includes other conditions like arteritic anterior ischemic optic neuropathy (associated with inflammation of arteries), optic neuritis (inflammation of the optic nerve), infiltrative and compressive types of optic neuropathy (where the optic nerve is invaded or pressed upon by abnormal substances or structures), diabetic papillopathy (swelling of the optic disc in diabetes), radiation-induced damage to the optic nerve, neuroretinitis (inflammation of the optic nerve and retina), and swelling of the optic disc linked with retinal diseases like central retinal vein occlusion.

=== Predisposing conditions ===
While most cases of NAION have no known cause, it has been frequently linked to certain conditions. These include general surgical procedures, cataract surgery, hemorrhagic shock, certain medications, and optic disc drusen. The exact mechanism of optic nerve ischemia in these cases remains unclear, but contributing factors may include hypotension, anemia, hypoxia, and changes in the autoregulation of optic nerve arterial blood flow. The incidence of ischemic optic neuropathy leading to vision loss following general surgeries ranges between 0.1% and 0.002%.

=== Drug reactions ===
Certain medications, including semaglutide, amiodarone and phosphodiesterase type 5 (PDE5) inhibitors like sildenafil (Viagra, the firstline treatment for erectile dysfunction), have been associated with NAION-like symptoms, including optic disc swelling and hemorrhages. The relationship between these medications and vision loss remains unclear due to the evidence being anecdotal, the lack of clear dose-response relationship, and co-existing risk factors. Clinical studies suggest a temporal increase in AION risk following PDE5 inhibitor use, leading to recommendations against their use in NAION affected individuals.

GLP-1 agonists, a class of medications which are used to treat diabetes and obesity, appear to significantly increase the risk of developing NAION; however, further research is needed to establish if the observed association is a causal relationship. Since both eyes tend to have a similar shape, the optometrist or ophthalmologist will look at the good eye to assess the anatomical predisposition. The unaffected eye has a 14.7% risk of NAION within five years. A number of uncontrolled single case or small number of patient reports have associated NAION with use of oral erectile dysfunction drugs.

=== Optic disc drusen ===
NAION in patients with optic disc drusen has unique characteristics: earlier onset, history of transient visual disturbances, and generally better visual outcomes. Mechanical pressure from drusen on blood vessels near the optic nerve may contribute to NAION development in these individuals.

=== Sleep apnea ===
Sleep apnea is a condition characterized by repeated interruptions in breathing during sleep, significantly affecting the flow of blood through the brain's blood vessels. These interruptions cause intermittent hypoxia, leading to vascular changes such as the constriction of cerebral blood vessels, thereby impacting overall brain blood flow. Sleep apnea can also result in reduced blood flow in the ciliary artery area, contributing to the development of NAION through various mechanisms.

The results of a retrospective study investigating high altitude (7,000-9,000 feet) as a potential risk factor for NAION suggested that high-altitude-associated NAION might be linked to undiagnosed obstructive sleep apnea. The study concluded that NAION could occur under high-altitude conditions, often in younger individuals with obstructive sleep apnea and "disc-at-risk".

Each apnea episode typically causes temporary increases in blood pressure and heart rate, leading to fluctuations that can result in irregular blood flow to the brain. This may cause long-term changes in the structure and function of cerebral blood vessels. The brain's mechanism for maintaining constant blood flow despite changes in systemic blood pressure, known as cerebral autoregulation, can be impaired by sleep apnea. This impairment results in periods of both reduced and excessive cerebral blood flow.

Repeated airway obstruction during sleep leads to intermittent hypoxia, causing oxidative stress and damaging endothelial cells of blood vessels, including those supplying the optic nerve head. Chronic intermittent hypoxia impairs endothelial function, reducing nitric oxide production, which leads to vasoconstriction and reduced blood flow to the optic nerve head. Additionally, fluctuations in pressure within the thoracic cavity during apnea episodes can alter intraocular pressure, affecting the blood supply to the optic nerve head. Sleep apnea often causes dips in blood pressure during sleep, particularly in the early morning hours, reducing blood supply to the optic nerve head and increasing the risk of ischemia.

== Treatment ==
Proposed treatments include hyperbaric oxygen, levodopa or carbidopa, aspirin, transvitreal optic neurotomy, bevacizumab and vitrectomy. The Ischemic Optic Neuropathy Decompression Trial observed that while spontaneous visual function deterioration occurred in 12% of 125 control eyes, the condition worsened in 24% of 119 eyes that underwent decompressive surgery. The application of corticosteroids in NAION treatment remains a topic of debate.

Research into potential therapies for NAION is ongoing, including studies using animal models to explore neuroprotective treatments for the optic nerve. Despite these efforts, including a clinical trial examining the potential neuroprotective effects of topical brimonidine that was discontinued due to stringent eligibility requirements, effective treatment for idiopathic NAION remains elusive. Further trials have been halted prematurely. A third trial investigated the intravitreal injection of a small interfering ribonucleic acid targeting caspase 2 as a treatment approach.

=== Epigenetic reprogramming ===
Epigenetic reprogramming through a novel gene therapy shows promise in restoring vision loss in a non-human primate model of NAION. This study builds on previous research demonstrating that AAV2-induced transient expression of the reprogramming genes Oct4, Sox2, and Klf4 (OSK) could reverse retinal aging and restore visual function in mice. Given the limitations of mice for modeling human vision, African green monkeys were used as a more accurate model. NAION was induced in these primates, and two groups were treated with either AAV2-OSK gene therapy or a vehicle. The results showed that pre-treated eyes with AAV2-OSK had significantly improved visual function compared to vehicle-treated eyes, as measured by parameters such as pERG response and optic nerve axon count. Post-treatment also resulted in significant recovery, albeit after an initial decline. These findings suggest that AAV2-OSK gene therapy has potential for clinical application in treating human optic nerve diseases.

== Epidemiology ==
NAION is the most frequently diagnosed sudden optic nerve disease in adults over 50, predominantly affecting Caucasians, with variable rates reported in Asian populations, and affecting males more than females. Presentation can vary, but patients typically report painless visual loss upon waking up in the morning or after a nap. While the exact number of cases is unclear, estimates suggest thousands of new cases occur annually in the United States alone. Associations with other health issues like diabetes and sleep apnea have been observed, though links with arteriosclerosis and cerebrovascular diseases are not typically found with NAION.

== Etymology ==
The name non-arteritic anterior ischemic optic neuropathy is derived from several medical terms that describe the condition:

- Non-arteritic: Indicates that the condition is not related to inflammation or damage of the arteries, which would be arteritic anterior ischemic optic neuropathy.
- Anterior: Refers to the front part of the optic nerve, which is located at the point where the optic nerve enters the eye (optic disc).
- Ischemic: Denotes a lack of sufficient blood flow, leading to tissue damage.
- Optic neuropathy: Refers to damage or dysfunction of the optic nerve, which transmits visual information from the eye to the brain, leading to visual impairment.
