= Posterior ischemic optic neuropathy =

Damage to the optic nerve's back part due to lack of blood flow

Posterior ischemic optic neuropath
- Specialty: Ophthalmology

Posterior ischemic optic neuropathy (PION) is a medical condition characterized by damage to the retrobulbar portion of the optic nerve due to inadequate blood flow (ischemia) to the optic nerve. Despite the term posterior, this form of damage to the eye's optic nerve due to poor blood flow also includes cases where the cause of inadequate blood flow to the nerve is anterior, as the condition describes a particular mechanism of visual loss as much as the location of damage in the optic nerve. In contrast, anterior ischemic optic neuropathy (AION) is distinguished from PION by the fact that AION occurs spontaneously and on one side in affected individuals with predisposing anatomic or cardiovascular risk factors.

== Signs and symptoms ==
PION is characterized by moderate to severe painless vision loss of abrupt onset. One or both eyes may be affected and color vision is typically impaired.

=== Ophthalmoscopic exam ===
Looking inside the person's eyes at the time of onset, ophthalmoscope exam reveals no visible changes to the optic nerve head. Weeks after ischemic insult, nerve atrophy originating from the damaged posterior optic nerve progresses to involve the anterior optic nerve head. Four to eight weeks after onset, atrophy of the optic nerve head is observable upon ophthalmoscope exam.

=== Pupils ===
If both eyes are affected by PION, the pupils may look symmetrical. However, if the eyes are asymmetrically affected, i.e. one eye's optic nerve is more damaged than the other, it will produce an important sign called an afferent pupillary defect.

Defective light perception in one eye causes an asymmetrical pupillary constriction reflex called the afferent pupillary defect (APD).

=== Arteritic PION ===
A-PION most commonly affects Caucasian women, with an average age of 73. At onset vision loss is unilateral, but without treatment it rapidly progresses to involve both eyes. Vision loss is usually severe, ranging from counting fingers to no light perception. Associated symptoms are jaw pain exacerbated by chewing, scalp tenderness, shoulder and hip pain, headache and fatigue.

=== Perioperative PION ===
Vision loss is usually apparent upon waking from general anesthesia. Signs observable to a bystander include long surgery duration and facial swelling. Vision loss is usually bilateral and severe, ranging from counting fingers to no light perception.

== Cause ==
PION is a watershed infarction of the optic nerve that may cause either unilateral or, more often, bilateral blindness. PION typically occurs in two categories of people:

- People who have undergone non-ocular surgery that is particularly prolonged or is associated with a significant blood loss.
- People who have experienced significant bleeding from an accident or ruptured blood vessels. In these cases, the person may develop anemia (too few oxygen-delivering red blood cells in the bloodstream) and often have low blood pressure as well. This combination can produce circulatory shock, and PION has sometimes been called shock-induced optic neuropathy.

The combination of anemia and low blood pressure means that the blood is carrying less oxygen to the tissues. The optic nerve can be at very high risk for damage from insufficient blood supply due to swelling (from lack of oxygen) in a confined bony space resulting in a compartment syndrome. Restricted blood flow can lead to permanent damage to the optic nerve and result in blindness (often in both eyes). For technical reasons this occurs more frequently with spinal surgeries.

=== Cardiovascular risk factors ===
Perioperative PION patients have a higher prevalence of cardiovascular risk factors than in the general population. Documented cardiovascular risks in people affected by perioperative PION include high blood pressure, diabetes mellitus, high levels of cholesterol in the blood, tobacco use, abnormal heart rhythms, stroke, and obesity. Men are also noted to be at higher risk, which is in accordance with the trend, as men are at higher risk of cardiovascular disease. These cardiovascular risks all interfere with adequate blood flow, and also may suggest a contributory role of defective vascular autoregulation.

=== Perioperative PION ===
As illustrated by the risk factors above, perioperative hypoxia is a multifactorial problem. Amidst these risk factors it may be difficult to pinpoint the optic nerve's threshold for cell death, and the exact contribution of each factor.

Low blood pressure and anemia are cited as perioperative complications in nearly all reports of PION, which suggests a causal relationship. However, while low blood pressure and anemia are relatively common in the perioperative setting, PION is exceedingly rare. Spine and cardiac bypass surgeries have the highest estimated incidences of PION, 0.028% and 0.018% respectively, and this is still extremely low. This evidence suggests that optic nerve injury in PION patients is caused by more than just anemia and low blood pressure.

Evidence suggests that the multifactorial origin of perioperative PION involves the risks discussed above and perhaps other unknown factors. Current review articles of PION propose that vascular autoregulatory dysfunction and anatomic variation are under-investigated subjects that may contribute to patient-specific susceptibility.

== Pathogenesis ==
=== PION ===
In both types of PION, decreased blood flow leads to the death of optic nerve cells. Ischemic injury to the optic nerve causes inflammation and swelling. Because the posterior optic nerve passes through the optic canal, a bony tunnel leading to the brain, swelling in this rigid space causes compression of the optic nerve. This compression worsens ischemia and perpetuates the cycle of injury, and swelling, and compression.

=== A-PION ===
A-PION is caused by an inflammatory disease called giant cell arteritis (GCA). GCA is an inflammatory disease of blood vessels. It is believed to be an autoimmune disease caused by inappropriate T-cell activity. When T-cells damage arteries supplying the optic nerve, a blood clot forms and stops blood flow. When blood flow stops, oxygen delivery stops and optic nerve fibers die.

=== Perioperative PION ===
The exact cause of perioperative PION is unknown. Many risk factors have been identified, all of which contribute to inadequate delivery of oxygen to optic nerve cells. Alone, none of these risk factors is enough to cause PION. However, in susceptible individuals, a combination of these risk factors produces devastating blindness. This evidence suggests that PION is a disease of multifactorial origin.

Risks of perioperative PION can be divided into two categories, intraoperative ischemic pressures, and cardiovascular risk factors.

==== Intraoperative ischemic pressures ====
Many causes of decreased blood flow during surgery are systemic, i.e. they decrease blood flow throughout the body. Studies have shown that nearly all perioperative PION patients had prolonged periods of low blood pressure during the operation and postoperative anemia. The average perioperative PION patient loses 4 liters of blood during surgery, and the majority receive blood transfusions. Massive blood loss is just one cause of low blood pressure. Medications used for general anesthesia can also lower blood pressure. The average surgery duration in PION cases is 7 to 9 hours, which increases the risk of prolonged low blood pressure.

Other intraoperative ischemic pressures are local, i.e. they decrease blood flow to the affected area, the optic nerve. Facial swelling, periorbital swelling, direct orbital compression, facedown position during surgery, and a tilted operating table in feet-above-head position, have all been reported to be associated with perioperative PION. All of these factors are believed to increase tissue pressure and venous pressure around the optic nerve, thereby decreasing local blood flow and oxygen delivery.

Surgeries with the highest estimated incidence of PION are surgeries with a higher risk of the aforementioned conditions. In spine surgery, patients are susceptible to significant blood loss, and they are positioned face down for long periods of time, which increases venous pressure, decreases arterial perfusion pressure, and often causes facial swelling (increased tissue pressure). Spine surgery is estimated to have the highest incidence of PION, 0.028%. Long duration of feet-above-head position in prostate surgery has also been suggested to increase risk of PION.

== Diagnosis ==
The diagnosis of PION is often difficult since the optic nerves initially appear normal. The injury occurs posterior to that portion of the nerve visible during ophthalmoscopic examination. There may be an abnormal relative pupillary response (APD) if the injury is confined to one optic nerve, but often it is bilateral and the symmetry of pupillary responses is maintained. Furthermore, MRI scanning may not be helpful. It is not uncommon for the erroneous diagnoses of malingering or cortical blindness to be made. If possible, an urgent neuro-ophthalmology consult is most likely to lead to the correct diagnosis.

There is no confirmatory test for PION. PION is a diagnosis of exclusion. To prevent impending blindness, it is urgent to rule out giant cell arteritis when a patient over 50 presents with sudden vision loss.

=== Differential diagnosis ===
In the postoperative setting, without gross eye injury, visual loss requires an assessment of the whole visual system for ischemic damage. The optic nerve is not the only tissue of the visual pathway susceptible to decreased blood flow. Decreased oxygenation of the retina or brain could also impair vision.

=== Anterior ischemic optic neuropathy ===
PION is less common than Anterior Ischemic Optic Neuropathy (AION). Blood supply and surrounding anatomy make the anterior and posterior portions of the optic nerve susceptible to different ischemic pressures.

The posterior optic nerve receives blood primarily from the pial branches of the ophthalmic artery. The optic canal, a boney tunnel leading to the brain, surrounds the most posterior part of this optic nerve segment.

The anterior optic nerve receives blood primarily from the posterior ciliary arteries. The anterior optic nerve, a.k.a. the optic nerve head, is surrounded by the scleral canal, and is vulnerable to crowding of nerve fibers. The portion of the optic nerve head that is visible by looking into the eye with an ophthalmoscope is called the optic disc.

=== PION versus AION ===
At the onset of symptoms, ophthalmoscope examination can differentiate AION from PION. If optic nerve head involvement is observed, it is AION. PION does not produce optic atrophy that is observable via ophthalmoscope until four to eight weeks after onset. In addition, AION often shows a characteristic altitudinal defect on a Humphrey Visual Field test.

=== GCA ===
The American College of Rheumatology has defined a combination of physical symptoms and inflammatory changes to diagnose giant cell arteritis.

== Prevention ==
Individuals with a history of high blood pressure, diabetes, and smoking are most susceptible to PION as they have a compromised system of blood vessel autoregulation. Hence, extra efforts may need to be taken for them in the form of careful or staged surgery or the controlling the anemia from blood loss (by administration of blood transfusions), and the careful maintenance of their blood pressure.

== Treatment ==
Once visual loss has occurred, it becomes more problematic, but there are reports of recovered vision if blood transfusions and agents that raise blood pressure are administered within hours.

=== A-PION ===
If a diagnosis of GCA is suspected, treatment with steroids should begin immediately. A sample (biopsy) of the temporal artery should be obtained to confirm the diagnosis and guide future management, but should not delay initiation of treatment. Treatment does not recover lost vision, but prevents further progression and second eye involvement. High dose corticosteroids may be tapered down to low doses over approximately one year.

=== Perioperative ===
Rapid blood transfusions, to correct anemia and raise blood pressure, may improve PION outcomes. In one report of a related disease, hypotension-induced AION, 3 out of 3 patients who received rapid transfusions reported partial recovery of vision. While rapid transfusions offer some hope, the prognosis for perioperative PION remains poor. Prevention remains the best way to reduce PION.

One retrospective report proposes that incidence of PION could be reduced in high-risk cases by altering surgical management. For example, for patients undergoing spine surgery, measures could be taken to minimize intraoperative hypotension, to accelerate the process of blood replacement, and to aggressively treat facial swelling.

== Epidemiology ==
PION most commonly affects the elderly. The mean patient age was 62 years in one series (range 18 to 90 years).The mean age varies by etiology category; patients with giant cell arteritis (GCA) are older (mean 78 years, range 50 to 82 years), while those with PION in the setting of spine surgery are younger on average.

There is a higher than expected prevalence of atherosclerotic risk factors and comorbid vascular disease, especially in patients with nonarteritic (idiopathic) PION, with 87 percent of patients having at least one risk factor for, or one other manifestation of, atherosclerotic vascular disease.

While anterior ischemic optic neuropathy (AION) appears to be more common than PION after cardiac surgery, PION is relatively more common in cases of spine surgery.
