= Anterior ischemic optic neuropathy =

Damage to the optic nerve's front part due to lack of blood flow

- Specialty: Ophthalmology, optometry

Anterior ischemic optic neuropathy (AION) is a medical condition involving loss of vision caused by damage to the anterior portion of the optic nerve as a result of insufficient blood supply (ischemia). This form of ischemic optic neuropathy is generally categorized as two types: arteritic AION (or AAION), in which the loss of vision is the result of an inflammatory disease of arteries in the head called temporal arteritis, and non-arteritic AION (abbreviated as NAION, NAAION, or sometimes simply as AION), which is due to non-inflammatory disease of small blood vessels. It is in contrast to posterior ischemic optic neuropathy, which affects the retrobulbar portion of the optic nerve.

== Symptoms and signs ==
NAION typically presents suddenly upon awakening. The affected person notes seeing poorly in one eye. Vision in that eye is obscured by a dark shadow, often involving just the upper or lower half of vision, usually the area closer to the nose. There is no pain. Within approximately six months following the infarct, visual acuity improves by three or more lines of vision on the Snellen Chart (the chart with smaller letters on each lower line) in 42.7% of patients, while in 12.4% of patients, vision worsens by three lines. Opposite eye involvement occurs in approximately 15% to 20% of patients with NAION within 5 years. It is not always devastating as visual acuity may remain only moderately impaired. Furthermore, most cases of NAION involve the loss of a hemifield (either the upper or lower half of the visual field, but not both). A few cases of NAION involve near-total loss of vision.

== Risk factors ==
The mechanism of injury for NAION used to be quite controversial. However, experts in the field have come to a consensus that most cases involve two main risk factors. The first is a predisposition in the form of a type of optic disc shape. The optic disc is where the axons from the retinal ganglion cells collect into the optic nerve. The optic nerve is the bundle of axons that carry the visual signals from the eye to the brain. This optic nerve must penetrate through the wall of the eye, and the hole to accommodate this is usually 20-30% larger than the nerve diameter. In some patients the optic nerve is nearly as large as the opening in the back of the eye, and the optic disc appears "crowded" when seen by ophthalmoscopy. A crowded disc is also referred to as a "disc at risk". While a risk factor, the vast majority of individuals with crowded discs do not experience NAION.

The second major risk factor involves more general cardiovascular risk factors. The most common are diabetes, hypertension and high cholesterol levels. While these factors predispose a patient to develop NAION, the most common precipitating factor is marked fall of blood pressure during sleep (nocturnal arterial hypotension)- that is why at least 75% of the patients first discover visual loss first on waking from sleep. When other risk factors for NAION are present, taking blood pressure medications at night should be avoided as this can exacerbate nighttime hypotension. Beta blockers in particular are associated with increased incidence of NAION. These vascular risk factors lead to ischemia (poor blood supply) to a portion of the optic disc. The disc then swells, and in a crowded optic disc, this leads to compression and more ischemia.

GLP-1 agonists, a class of medications which are used to treat diabetes and obesity, appear to significantly increase the risk of developing NAION; however, further research is needed to establish if the observed association is a causal relationship. Since both eyes tend to have a similar shape, the optometrist or ophthalmologist will look at the good eye to assess the anatomical predisposition. The unaffected eye has a 14.7% risk of NAION within five years. A number of uncontrolled single case or small number of patient reports have associated NAION with use of oral erectile dysfunction drugs.

== Diagnosis ==
Since arteritic AION is similar in presentation to non-arteritic AION, patients over the age of 50 diagnosed with NAION must be evaluated to exclude AAION (symptoms: painful jaw muscle spasms, scalp tenderness, unintentional weight loss, fatigue, myalgias and loss of appetite); NAION patients over the age of 75 should always be tested.

The distinction between AAION and non-arteritic AION was made to highlight the different etiologies of anterior ischemic optic neuropathy. AAION is due to temporal arteritis (also called giant-cell arteritis), an inflammatory disease of medium-sized blood vessels (Chapel-Hill-Conference) that occurs especially with advancing age. In contrast, NAION results from the coincidence of cardiovascular risk factors in a patient with "crowded" optic discs. Non-arteritic AION is more common than AAION and usually occurs in slightly younger persons. While only a few cases of NAION result in near total loss of vision, most cases of AAION result in nearly complete vision loss.

Nonarteritic anterior ischemic optic neuropathy is an isolated white-matter stroke of the optic nerve (ON). NAION is the most common cause of sudden optic nerve-related vision loss, affecting more than 10,000 Americans every year, often bilaterally. No clinically effective treatments exist, largely because little is known about its pathophysiology, and there are few histopathological studies of the acute condition.

An exhaustive review article published in March 2009 described the latest information on arteritic and non-arteritic ischemic optic neuropathy, both anterior (A-AION and NA-AION) and posterior (A-PION, NA-PION, and surgical).

== Treatment ==
Once NAION happens, it was thought that there was no accepted treatment to reverse the damage. However, a recent uncontrolled retrospective large study has shown that if patients are treated with large doses of corticosteroid therapy during the early stages of NAION, in eyes with initial visual acuity of 20/70 or worse, seen within 2 weeks of onset, there was visual acuity improvement in 70% in the treated group compared to 41% in the untreated group (odds ratio of improvement: 3.39; 95% CI:1.62, 7.11; p < 0.001). That study and a natural history study on NAION (Ophthalmology 2008;115: 298–305.) showed that visual acuity can improve up to 6 months and not after that. To minimize the risk of further visual loss in the fellow eye or the same eye, it is essential to reduce the risk factors. Common sense dictates trying to control the cardiovascular risk factors for many reasons, including protection from this happening to the second eye. Sudden vision loss should lead to an ophthalmological consultation. If NAION is suspected, then ideally a neuro-ophthalmologist's consultation should be obtained.

A recent Cochrane Review sought to determine the extent of safety and efficacy of optic nerve decompression surgery for NAION, compared to other treatments, or no treatment. The one study included in the review found no improvements in visual acuity among patients who underwent surgery for NAION, and adverse events (pain, double vision) experienced by participants who underwent surgery.

There is much research currently underway looking at ways to protect the nerve (neuroprotection) or even regenerate new fibers within the optic nerve. So far there is no evidence in human studies that the so-called neuroprotectors have any beneficial effect in NAION. However, there is a new current clinical trial for the treatment of NAION in the United States with plans to include sites in India, Israel, Germany and Australia (see NORDICclinicaltrials.com and https://clinicaltrials.gov/). This trial will test the use of a synthetic siRNA that blocks caspase 2, an important enzyme in the apoptosis cycle. In addition to such research, patents have been applied for by Pfizer, The University of Southern California, Otsuka Pharmaceutical and other individual inventors for innovations related to the treatment of anterior ischemic optic neuropathy.

In recent years, pentoxifylline has emerged as a potential treatment option for NAION and other diseases involving ocular ischemia. Pentoxifylline has been shown to reduce erythrocyte rigidity, resulting in decreased blood viscosity and increased flow velocity. Animal studies have demonstrated that pentoxifylline can inhibit TNF and, in turn, prevent retinal ganglion cell death and axonal degeneration associated with optic neuropathy in a dose-dependent manner. A Cochrane Review on treatments for acute CRAO included one randomized clinical trial involving pentoxifylline, which showed that pentoxifylline use (three 600 mg tablets daily) was associated with improved retinal perfusion, but it was unclear if significant improvements in visual acuity were also observed. Similar findings have been shown using Doppler OCT imaging in patients with NAION, though a study in India reported visual improvement compared to placebo in patients with optic neuropathy. Of note, TNF may be important in the immune response to certain nematode parasitic infections, and so pentoxifylline should be used with caution for those living in areas of parasite infestation; however, it is probably safe to use in otherwise healthy individuals living in urban, temperate environments. Overall, routine use of pentoxifylline in ischemic optic neuropathies was not supported given limited evidence, but the absence of major adverse effects and the absence of other proven therapies suggest a possible therapeutic role for pentoxifylline.

== Incidence ==
It is estimated that the incidence of AION in the US is about 8,000 persons per year.
