= Halo sign =

Pattern seen in ultrasound examinations

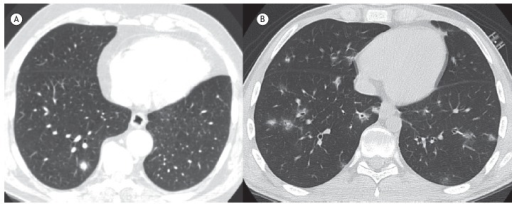
- In A, axial CT scan of the chest showing a right lower lobe pulmonary nodule surrounded by areas of ground-glass opacity (the CT halo sign). In B, axial CT scan of the chest showing multiple, randomly distributed pulmonary nodules surrounded by the CT halo sign; the final diagnosis was aspergillosis.
- Differential diagnosis: temporal arteritis

In radiology, the halo sign is a finding of a dark halo around the arterial lumen on ultrasound that suggests the diagnosis of temporal arteritis. The standard diagnostic test for temporal arteritis is biopsy; however, ultrasound and MRI show promise for replacing it.

The halo sign of temporal arteritis should not be confused with Deuel's halo sign, which is a sign of fetal death.

The halo sign is also understood as a region of ground-glass attenuation surrounding a pulmonary nodule on an X-ray computed tomography (CT scan) of the chest. It can be associated with hemorrhagic nodules, tumors, or inflammatory processes, but is most commonly known as an early radiographic sign of invasive pulmonary infection by the fungus species Aspergillus.

In nursing, the halo sign is the result of a test to see if drainage from a head injury contains cerebrospinal fluid. When a Dextrostix or Tes-Tape test gives a positive reading for glucose, the drainage must be further tested because glucose is also found in the blood. To perform the test, the leaking fluid is dripped onto a 4x4 gauze or towel. Positive results are indicated by blood coalescing into the center, leaving an outer ring of cerebrospinal fluid.
