= Optic neuropathy =

- Other names: Optic nerve disorder
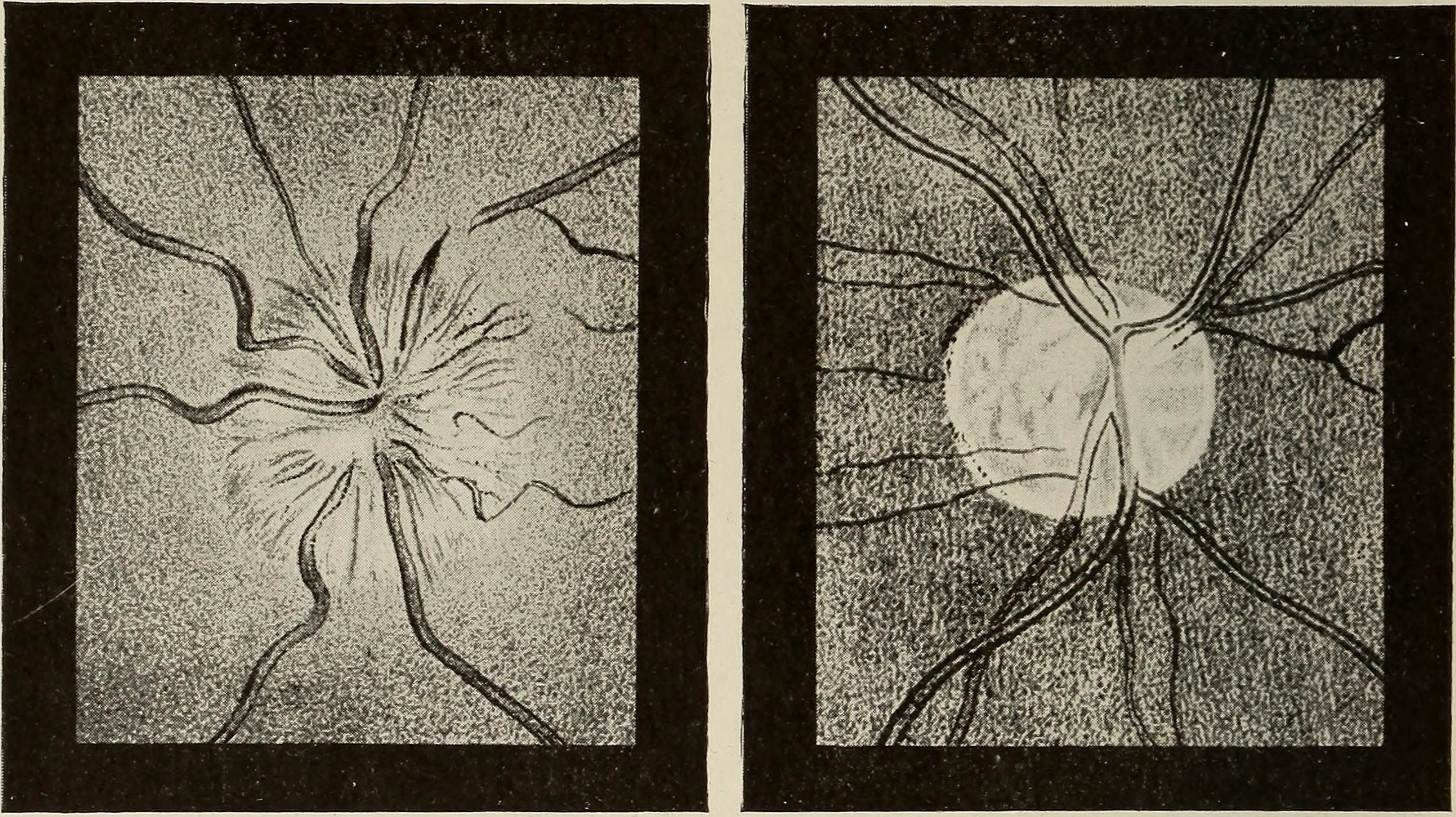
- Illustrations depicting optic neuritis (left) and optic neuropathy (right), dated 1919
- Specialty: Neurology, Ophthalmology
- Symptoms: Vision loss, reduced color vision, blurred vision
- Complications: Permanent vision loss, blindness
- Usual onset: Sudden or gradual
- Duration: Variable, depending on cause
- Types: Ischemic optic neuropathy, optic neuritis, traumatic optic neuropathy, hereditary optic neuropathy
- Causes: Vascular issues, inflammation, trauma, toxins, genetic mutations (e.g., Leber's hereditary optic neuropathy)
- Risk factors: Age, smoking, cardiovascular disease, genetic predisposition
- Diagnostic method: Clinical evaluation, visual field tests, optical coherence tomography, MRI
- Differential diagnosis: Glaucoma, retinal disease, brain lesions
- Prevention: Managing risk factors like blood pressure, avoiding smoking, regular eye exams
- Treatment: Addressing underlying cause (e.g., steroids for inflammation, surgery for trauma), vision rehabilitation
- Medication: Corticosteroids (for optic neuritis), other medications depending on the cause
- Prognosis: Variable; some cases recover, others lead to permanent vision loss
- Frequency: Common in individuals with risk factors (e.g., older adults, smokers)
- Deaths: None directly from optic neuropathy, but complications from underlying causes (e.g., stroke) can be fatal

Optic neuropathy is damage to the optic nerve from any cause. The optic nerve is a bundle of millions of fibers in the retina that sends visual signals to the brain.

Damage and death of these nerve cells, or neurons, leads to characteristic features of optic neuropathy. The main symptom is loss of vision, with colors appearing subtly washed out in the affected eye. A pale disc is characteristic of long-standing optic neuropathy. In many cases, only one eye is affected and a person may not be aware of the loss of color vision until the examiner asks them to cover the healthy eye.

Optic neuropathy is often called optic atrophy, to describe the loss of some or most of the fibers of the optic nerve.

== Signs and symptoms ==
The main symptom is loss of vision, with colors appearing subtly washed out in the affected eye. In many cases, only one eye is affected and the person may not be aware of the loss of color vision until the examiner asks them to cover the healthy eye. People may also engage in "eccentric viewing" using peripheral vision to compensate for central vision loss characteristic in genetic, toxic, or nutritional optic neuropathy.

On examination of the fundus, a pale optic disc is characteristic of long-standing optic neuropathy.

== Causes ==
The optic nerve contains axons of nerve cells that emerge from the retina, leave the eye at the optic disc, and go to the visual cortex where input from the eye is processed into vision. There are 1.2 million optic nerve fibers that derive from the retinal ganglion cells of the inner retina. Damage to the optic nerve can have different causes:

=== Ischemic ===
In ischemic optic neuropathies, there is insufficient blood flow (ischemia) to the optic nerve. The anterior optic nerve is supplied by the short posterior ciliary artery and choroidal circulation, while the retrobulbar optic nerve is supplied intraorbitally by a pial plexus, which arises from the ophthalmic artery, internal carotid artery, anterior cerebral artery, and anterior communicating arteries. Ischemic optic neuropathies are classified based on the location of the damage and the cause of reduced blood flow if known.

- Anterior ischemic optic neuropathy (AION) includes diseases that affect the optic nerve head and cause swelling of the optic disc. These diseases often cause sudden rapid visual loss in one eye. Inflammatory diseases of the blood vessels, like giant-cell arteritis, polyarteritis nodosa, eosinophilic granulomatosis with polyangiitis, granulomatosis with polyangiitis, and rheumatoid arthritis can cause arteritic AIONs (AAION). The vast majority of AIONs are nonarteritic AIONs (NAION). The most common acute optic neuropathy in patients over 50 years of age, NAION has an annual incidence of 2.3-10.2/100,000. NAION presents as a painless loss of vision, often when awakening, that occurs over hours to days. Most patients lose the lower half of their visual field (an inferior altitudinal loss), though superior altitudinal loss is also common. The pathophysiology of NAION is unknown, but it is related to poor circulation in the optic nerve head. NAION is often associated with diabetes mellitus, elevated intraocular pressure (acute glaucoma, eye surgery), high cholesterol, hypercoagulable states, a drop in blood pressure (bleeding, cardiac arrest, peri-operative esp. cardiac and spine procedures), and sleep apnea. Rarely, amiodarone, interferon-alpha, and erectile dysfunction drugs have been associated with this disease.
- Posterior ischemic optic neuropathy is a syndrome of sudden visual loss with optic neuropathy without initial disc swelling with subsequent development of optic atrophy. This can occur in patients who are predisposed to AAION and NAION as described above as well as those who had cardiac and spine surgery or serious episodes of hypotension.
- Radiation optic neuropathy (RON) is also thought to be due to ischemia of the optic nerve that occurs 3 months to 8 or more years after radiation therapy to the brain and orbit. It occurs most often around 1.5 years after treatment and results in irreversible and severe vision loss, which may also be associated with damage to the retina (radiation retinopathy). This is thought to be due to damage to dividing glial and vascular endothelial cells. RON can present with a transient visual loss followed by an acute painless visual loss in one or both eyes several weeks later. The risk of RON is significantly increased with radiation doses over 50 Gy.

=== Inflammatory ===
Optic neuritis is inflammation of the optic nerve, which is associated with swelling and destruction of the myelin sheath covering the optic nerve. Young adults, usually females, are most commonly affected. Symptoms of optic neuritis in the affected eye include pain on eye movement, sudden loss of vision, and decrease in color vision (especially reds). Optic neuritis, when combined with the presence of multiple demyelinating white matter brain lesions on MRI, is suspicious for multiple sclerosis.

Several causes and clinical courses are possible for the optic neuritis. It can be classified in:

- Single isolated optic neuritis (SION)
- relapsing isolated optic neuritis (RION)
- chronic relapsing inflammatory optic neuropathy (CRION)
- the neuromyelitis optica (NMO) spectrum disorder
- multiple sclerosis associated optic neuritis (MSON)
- unclassified optic neuritis (UCON) forms.

Medical examination of the optic nerve with an ophthalmoscope may reveal a swollen optic nerve, but the nerve may also appear normal. Presence of an afferent pupillary defect, decreased color vision, and visual field loss (often central) are suggestive of optic neuritis. Recovery of visual function is expected within 10 weeks. However, attacks may lead to permanent axonal loss and thinning of the retinal nerve fiber layer.

=== Compressive ===
Tumors, infections, and inflammatory processes can cause lesions within the orbit and, less commonly, the optic canal. These lesions may compress the optic nerve, resulting optic disc swelling and progressive visual loss. Implicated orbital disorders include optic gliomas, meningiomas, hemangiomas, lymphangiomas, dermoid cysts, carcinoma, lymphoma, multiple myeloma, inflammatory orbital pseudotumor, and thyroid ophthalmopathy. Patients often have bulging out of the eye (proptosis) with mild color deficits and almost normal vision with disc swelling.

=== Infiltrative ===
The optic nerve can be infiltrated by a variety of processes, including tumors, inflammation, and infections. Tumors that can infiltrate the optic nerve can be primary (optic gliomas, capillary hemangiomas, and cavernous hemangiomas) or secondary (metastatic carcinoma, nasopharyngeal carcinoma, lymphoma, and leukemia). The most common inflammatory disorder that infiltrates the optic nerve is sarcoidosis. Opportunistic fungi, viruses, and bacteria may also infiltrate the optic nerve. The optic nerve may be elevated if the infiltration occurs in the proximal portion of the nerve. The appearance of the nerve on examination depends on the portion of the nerve that is affected.

=== Traumatic ===
The optic nerve can be damaged when exposed to direct or indirect injury. Direct optic nerve injuries are caused by trauma to the head or orbit that crosses normal tissue planes and disrupts the anatomy and function of the optic nerve; e.g., a bullet or forceps that physically injures the optic nerve. Indirect injuries, like blunt trauma to the forehead during a motor vehicle accident, transmit force to the optic nerve without transgressing tissue planes. This type of force causes the optic nerve to absorb excess energy at the time of impact. The most common site of injury of the optic nerve is the intracanalicular portion of the nerve. Deceleration injuries from motor vehicle or bicycle accidents account for 17 to 63 percent of cases. Falls are also a common cause, and optic neuropathy most commonly occurs when there is a loss of consciousness associated with multi-system trauma and serious brain injury. In less than three percent of patients, an orbital hemorrhage after an injection behind the eye (retrobulbar block) can cause injury to the optic nerve, but this is readily manageable if it does not involve direct optic nerve injury and is caught early. The role of high-dose steroids and orbital decompression in treating these patients is controversial and, if administered, must be done very soon after injury with minimal effects. In patients with an orbital fracture, vomiting or nose blowing can force air into the orbit and possibly compromise the integrity of the optic nerve.

=== Mitochondrial ===
Mitochondria play a central role in maintaining the life cycle of retinal ganglion cells because of their high energy dependence. Mitochondria are made within the central somata of the retinal ganglion cell, transported down axons, and distributed where they are needed. Genetic mutations in mitochondrial DNA, vitamin depletion, alcohol and tobacco abuse, and use of certain drugs can cause derangements in efficient transport of mitochondria, which can cause a primary or secondary optic neuropathy.

=== Nutritional ===
A nutritional optic neuropathy may be present in a patient with obvious evidence of under-nutrition (weight loss and wasting), but also malnutrition due to picky eating as in autism. Months of depletion are usually necessary to deplete body stores of most nutrients. Undernourished patients often have many vitamin and nutrient deficiencies and have low serum protein levels. However, the optic neuropathy associated with pernicious anemia and vitamin B_{12} deficiency can even be seen in well-nourished individuals. Gastric bypass surgery may also cause a vitamin B_{12} deficiency from poor absorption.

Patients who have nutritional optic neuropathy may notice that colors are not as vivid or bright as before and that the color red is washed out. This normally occurs in both eyes at the same time and is not associated with any eye pain. They might initially notice a blur or fog, followed by a drop in vision. While vision loss may be rapid, progression to blindness is unusual. These patients tend to have blind spots in the center of their vision with preserved peripheral vision. In most cases, the pupils continue to respond normally to light.

=== Toxins ===
Many heavy metals and toxicants can cause optic neuropathy:

- Lead, mercury, cobalt, arsenic, organic solvents, and pesticides have been reported.
- The most recognized cause of toxic optic neuropathy is methanol poisoning. This can be a life-threatening event that normally accidentally occurs when the person mistook or substituted, methanol for ethyl alcohol. The person initially has nausea and vomiting, followed by respiratory distress, headache, and visual loss 18–48 hours after consumption. Without treatment, people can go blind, and their pupils will dilate and stop reacting to light.
- Ethylene glycol, a component of automobile antifreeze, is a poison that is toxic to the whole body including the optic nerve. Consumption can be fatal, or recovery can occur with permanent neurologic and ophthalmologic deficits. While the visual loss is not very common, increased intracranial pressure can cause bilateral optic disc swelling from cerebral edema. A clue to the cause of intoxication is the presence of oxalate crystals in the urine. Like methanol intoxication, treatment is ethanol consumption.
- Ethambutol, a drug commonly used to treat tuberculosis, is notorious for causing toxic optic neuropathy. People with vision loss from ethambutol toxicity lose vision in both eyes equally. This initially presents with problems with colors (dyschromatopsia) and can leave central visual deficits. If vision loss occurs while using ethambutol, it would be best to discontinue this medication under a doctor's supervision. Vision can improve slowly after discontinuing ethambutol but rarely returns to baseline.
- Amiodarone is an antiarrhythmic medication commonly used for abnormal heart rhythms (atrial or ventricular tachyarrhythmias). Most patients on this medication get corneal epithelial deposits, but this medication has also been controversially associated with NAION. Patients on amiodarone with new visual symptoms should be evaluated by an ophthalmologist.
- Tobacco exposure, most commonly through pipe and cigar smoking, can cause optic neuropathy. Middle-aged or elderly men are often affected and present with painless, slowly progressive, color distortion and visual loss in both eyes. The mechanism is unclear, but this has been reported to be more common in individuals who are already suffering from malnutrition.

=== Hereditary ===
The inherited optic neuropathies typically manifest asa symmetric bilateral central visual loss. Optic nerve damage in most inherited optic neuropathies is permanent and progressive.

- Leber's hereditary optic neuropathy (LHON) is the most frequently occurring mitochondrial disease, and this inherited form of acute or subacute vision loss predominantly affects young males. LHON usually presents with rapid vision loss in one eye followed by involvement of the second eye (usually within months). Visual acuity often remains stable and poor (around or below 20/200) with a residual central visual field defect. Patients with the 14484/ND6 mutation are most likely to have visual recovery.
- Dominant optic atrophy is an autosomal dominant disease caused by a defect in the nuclear gene OPA1. A slowly progressive optic neuropathy, dominant optic atrophy, usually presents in the first decade of life and is bilaterally symmetrical. Examination of these patients shows loss of visual acuity, temporal pallor of the optic discs, centrocecal scotomas with peripheral sparing, and subtle impairments in color vision.
- Behr's syndrome is a rare autosomal recessive disorder characterized by early-onset optic atrophy, ataxia, and spasticity.
- Berk–Tabatznik syndrome is a condition that shows symptoms of short stature, congenital optic atrophy and brachytelephalangy. This condition is extremely rare.

== Treatments ==
While optic neuropathy cannot be outright cured, there are surgical options to alleviate pain and symptoms associated with such diseases. The Endoscopic Endonasal Approach method (EEA) is a method of relieving pressure associated with tumors formed in the brain that press upon the optic nerve. It is a minimally invasive surgery.

In genetic and developmental causes of optic neuropathy, no surgeries have been proven treatments.

== See also ==
- Optic neuritis
- Ophthalmoplegia
- Glaucoma
