= Remitting seronegative symmetrical synovitis with pitting edema =

- Other names: Remitting seronegative symmetrical synovitis with pitting oedema RS3PE
- Specialty: Rheumatology

Remitting seronegative symmetrical synovitis with pitting edema (or sometimes RS_{3}PE) is a rare syndrome identified by symmetric polyarthritis, synovitis, acute pitting edema (swelling) of the back of the hands and/or feet, and a negative serum rheumatoid factor. If no underlying disorder can be identified (idiopathic RS3PE), this entity has an excellent prognosis and responds well to treatment.

RS3PE typically involves the joints of the extremities, specifically the metacarpophalangeal and proximal interphalangeal joints, wrists, shoulders, elbows, knees and ankles. It is more common in older adults, with the mean age between 70 and 80 years in most studies. It occurs more often in men than in women with a 2:1 ratio. It is unknown how common this condition is.

== Signs and symptoms ==
Individuals affected by RS3PE typically have repeated episodes of inflammation of the lining of their synovial joints and swelling of the end portion of the limbs. The arms and hands are more commonly affected than the legs and feet. Both sides are usually involved though RS3PE can affect only one side in certain cases.

== Causes ==
RS3PE is a constellation of symptoms that can be caused by many other conditions. Since there is no definitive diagnostic test, other conditions have to be ruled out before this rare condition can be diagnosed.

The main differential diagnosis is polymyalgia rheumatica (PMR), although pain, stiffness and weakness at the level of the shoulders and pelvic girdle with associated systemic symptoms (fever, malaise, fatigue, weight loss) is more typical of PMR. Prospective studies have found a subgroup of PMR patients with hand edema, as well as other similarities. Thus, RS3PE has been proposed as a condition related to PMR or even that they are both part of the same disorder. However, PMR typically requires protracted courses of steroids, whereas corticosteroids can be tapered more quickly with persisting remission in RS3PE.

Other rheumatological disorders that can cause the features typical for RS3PE include late onset (seronegative) rheumatoid arthritis, acute sarcoidosis, ankylosing spondylitis and other spondyloarthropathies such as psoriatic arthropathy, mixed connective tissue disease, chondrocalcinosis and arthropathy due to amyloidosis.

RS3PE has been documented in patients with cancers (Non-Hodgkin's lymphoma, gastric cancer, pancreatic cancer, lung cancer, breast cancer, colon cancer, prostate cancer and bladder cancer, among others), in whom it might represent a paraneoplastic manifestation. Other underlying disorders include vasculitides such as polyarteritis nodosa.

Other causes of edema include heart failure, hypoalbuminemia, nephrotic syndrome and venous stasis. The key distinguishing feature is that these conditions don't tend to manifest with pitting edema at the back of the hands.

== Pathogenesis ==
The disease mechanism (pathophysiology) of RS3PE remains unknown. One study suggested a possible role for vascular endothelial growth factor. A study using magnetic resonance imaging found that tenosynovitis of the extensors of the hands and feet is the major contributor to edema.

== Diagnosis ==
Ultrasonography and magnetic resonance imaging of the hands and/or feet have been proposed as useful diagnostic investigations in RS3PE.

Some studies linked RS3PE to HLA-B27 whereas others have not.

== Treatment ==
RS3PE responds excellently to low dose corticosteroids, with sustained and often complete remission. Non-steroidal anti-inflammatory drugs (NSAIDs) have also been used. Hydroxychloroquine has proven effective in some cases.

== History ==
In a 1985 paper published in The Journal of the American Medical Association, McCarty and colleagues first described a case series of patients with this disorder, for which they coined the abbreviation RS3PE. RS3PE was initially thought to represent a form of seronegative rheumatoid arthritis but is now believed to be a separate syndrome.
