= Rheumatology Research Foundation =

US nonprofit organization

Coordinates: 33.8485664°N 84.3475509°W

The Rheumatology Research Foundation is an American 501(c)(3) charitable organization that funds rheumatology research and training in the United States. The foundation was founded in 1985. It issues grants and awards to researchers.
