= Polymyalgia rheumatica =

Inflammatory disease featuring pain and stiffness

- In polymyalgia rheumatica, pain is usually located in the shoulders and hips.
- Specialty: Rheumatology
- Symptoms: Shoulder, neck and hip pain
- Usual onset: Age greater than 50
- Diagnostic method: Elevated inflammatory markers, CRP and ESR
- Differential diagnosis: Myositis, giant cell arteritis
- Medication: Corticosteroids

Polymyalgia rheumatica (PMR) is a systemic inflammatory disease characterized by pain or stiffness, usually in the neck, shoulders, upper arms, and hips, but which may occur all over the body. Almost all cases occur in people age 50 or older. Pain and stiffness of PMR is worse in the morning and improves throughout the day, but these symptoms frequently persist to some extent throughout the day and into the evening.

People who have polymyalgia rheumatica may also have temporal arteritis (giant cell arteritis), an inflammation of blood vessels in the face which can cause blindness if not treated quickly. The pain and stiffness can result in a lowered quality of life, and can lead to depression. The exact cause of PMR, including whether or not it may be an autoimmune disease, is unclear. Persons of Northern European descent are at greater risk. There is no definitive laboratory test, but C-reactive protein (CRP) and erythrocyte sedimentation rate (ESR) can be useful as non-specific markers of systemic inflammation.

PMR is usually treated with corticosteroids taken by mouth. Most people need to continue the corticosteroid treatment for two to three years. PMR sometimes goes away on its own in a year or two, but medications and self-care measures (e.g., eating the recommended amount of fruits and vegetables) can improve the rate of recovery.

PMR was first established as a distinct disease in 1966 by a case report on 11 patients at Mount Sinai Hospital in New York City. It takes its name from the Greek word Πολυμυαλγία polymyalgia, which means "pain in many muscles".

== Signs and symptoms ==
A wide range of symptoms can indicate if a person has polymyalgia rheumatica. The classic symptoms include:

- Pain and stiffness (moderate to severe) in the neck, shoulders, upper arms, thighs, and hips, which inhibits activity, especially in the morning, but which usually persists to some degree throughout the day. Pain can also occur in the groin area and in the buttocks. The pain can be limited to one of these areas as well. It is a disease of the "girdles" meaning shoulder girdle or pelvic girdle.
- Fatigue and lack of appetite (possibly leading to weight loss)
- Anemia
- An overall feeling of illness or flu-like symptoms.
- Low-grade (mild) fever or abnormal temperature is sometimes present.
  - High or spiking fevers may occur in patients who also have giant cell arteritis.
- Generalized weakness
  - Note that this is generalized weakness, not muscle weakness. The presence of muscle weakness likely indicates a different diagnosis.
- Inflammatory swelling and pain of wrists and/or knees (only ~25% of cases)
- Pitting edema (non-inflammatory swelling) of wrists, ankles, hands, and feet (only ~10% of cases)

=== Temporal arteritis ===
About 20% of people who are diagnosed with polymyalgia rheumatica also have temporal arteritis (also called giant cell arteritis), and about 50% of people with temporal arteritis have polymyalgia rheumatica. Some symptoms of temporal arteritis include headaches, scalp tenderness, jaw or facial soreness, distorted vision, or aching in the limbs caused by decreased blood flow, and fatigue.

== Causes ==
The pathophysiology of polymyalgia rheumatica is not well-understood. Evidence shows that there is likely a combined genetic and environmental pathophysiology behind the disease, but concrete identification of the causes, including whether or not polymyalgia rheumatica is an autoimmune disease, remains elusive. It is, at the very least, an immune-mediated disease, with both innate and adaptive immune system elements being known to play a role. Infectious diseases have historically been hypothesized as a likely trigger for disease in genetically susceptible people. Individual studies have sometimes found correlations between specific pathogens and development of the disease, but broader analysis fails to find significant correlations. Proposed causative pathogens, none of which have been proven, include:

- Mycoplasma pneumoniae
- Chlamydia pneumoniae
- Hepatitis B virus (HBV)
- Parvovirus B19
- Adenovirus (ADV)
- Respiratory syncytial virus (RSV)

The immune cell involvement in polymyalgia rheumatica includes the activation of dendritic cells and monocytes/macrophages, leading to inflammation in the synovium and bursae of the shoulder and hip girdles which is primarily mediated by the innate immune system. There is an altered balance between Th17 and Treg cells, with increased IL-6 levels driving Th17 cell activation. Disturbed B cell distribution and function are also observed, with a decrease in circulating B cells that recover after steroid treatment. Additionally, systemic activation of circulating monocytes is associated with increased IL-6 and IL-1 beta production. Associations of uncertain significance with multiple types of TNF have also been found.

Despite the severe pain associated with the condition in multiple muscle groups, as well as the signs of systemic inflammation, muscle biopsies have found no signs of localized inflammation in muscle tissue in patients with PMR. Electromyography studies also typically turn up normal. The only locations known definitively to be inflamed in PMR are the synovial membranes and bursae of joints.

Persons having the HLA-DR4 type of human leucocyte antigen appear to have a higher risk of PMR.

== Diagnosis ==
No specific test exists to diagnose polymyalgia rheumatica; many other diseases can cause inflammation and pain in muscles, but a few tests can help narrow down the cause of the pain. Limitation in shoulder motion or swelling of the joints in the wrists or hands, are noted by the doctor.

One blood test usually performed is the erythrocyte sedimentation rate (ESR) which measures how fast the patient's red blood cells settle in a test tube. The faster the red blood cells settle, the higher the ESR value (measured in mm/hour), which suggests that inflammation may be present. Many conditions can cause an elevated ESR, so this test alone is not proof that a person has polymyalgia rheumatica.

Another test that checks the level of C-reactive protein (CRP) in the blood may also be conducted. CRP is produced by the liver in response to an injury or infection, and people with polymyalgia rheumatica usually have high levels. However, like the ESR, this test is also not very specific.

Polymyalgia rheumatica is sometimes associated with temporal arteritis, a condition requiring more aggressive therapy. To test for this additional disorder, a biopsy sample may be taken from the temporal artery.

== Treatment ==
Prednisone is usual drug for PMR, and treatment frequently lasts for more than a year. If the patient does not experience dramatic improvement after three days of 10–20 mg oral prednisone per day, the diagnosis should be reconsidered. Sometimes relief of symptoms occurs in only several hours.

Nonsteroidal anti-inflammatory drugs (NSAIDs) such as ibuprofen are ineffective in the initial treatment of PMR, but they may be used in conjunction with the maintenance dose of corticosteroid.

Along with medical treatment, patients are encouraged to exercise and eat healthily, helping to maintain a strong immune system and build strong muscles and bones. A diet of fruits, vegetables, whole grains, and low-fat meat and dairy products, avoiding foods with high levels of refined sugars and salt is recommended. Research in the UK has also suggested that people with polymyalgia rheumatica would benefit from a falls assessment when first diagnosed, and regular treatment reviews.

== Epidemiology ==
No circumstances are certain as to which individuals will get polymyalgia rheumatica, but a few factors show a relationship with the disorder:

- Usually, PMR only affects adults over the age of 50.
- The average age of a person who has PMR is about 70 years old, with the highest prevalence in those older than 70.
- Women are three times as likely to get PMR as men.
- People of Western and Northern European descent are more likely to get this disease. It is more likely to affect people of Northern European origin; Scandinavians are especially vulnerable.
- About 50% of people with temporal arteritis also have polymyalgia rheumatica.

== See also ==
- Remitting seronegative symmetrical synovitis with pitting edema
- Tocilizumab
