= Erythrocyte sedimentation rate =

Physiological quantity

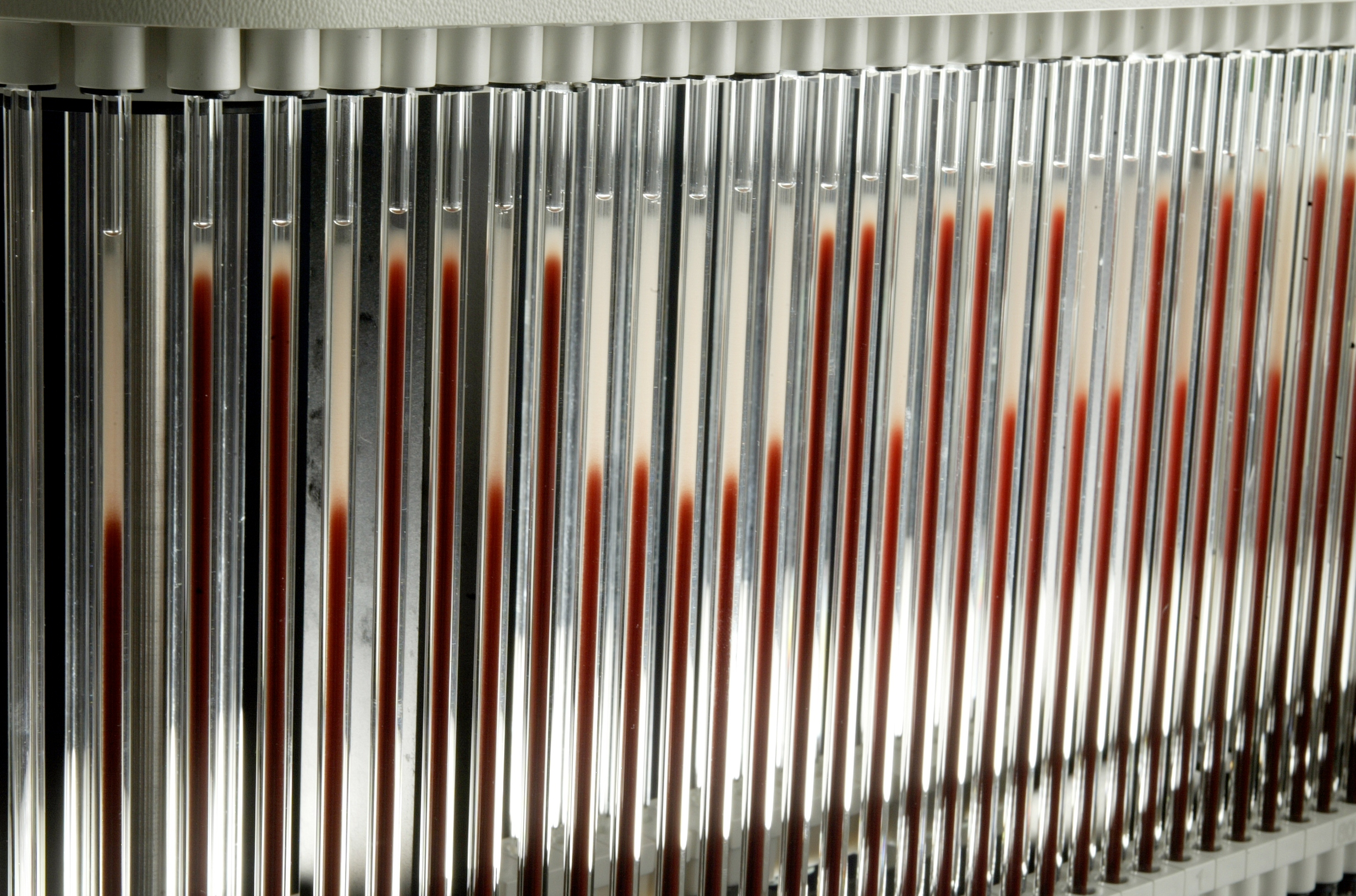
- Westergren pipette array on StaRRsed automated ESR analyzer. The ESR is the height (in mm) of the colourless portion at the top of the pipette after one hour.
- Synonyms: sedimentation rate, Westergren ESR, ESR, sed rate
- Reference range: Male: ≤ age/2 ; Female: ≤ (age + 10)/2. (Unit: mm/hour).
- Purpose: Detection of inflammation in body.
- Test of: The rate of sedimentation of erythrocytes in a vertical tube over an hour.
- Based on: The millimeters of transparent fluid present at the top portion of the vertical tube after an hour.
- MeSH: D001799
- MedlinePlus: 003638
- LOINC: 30341-2

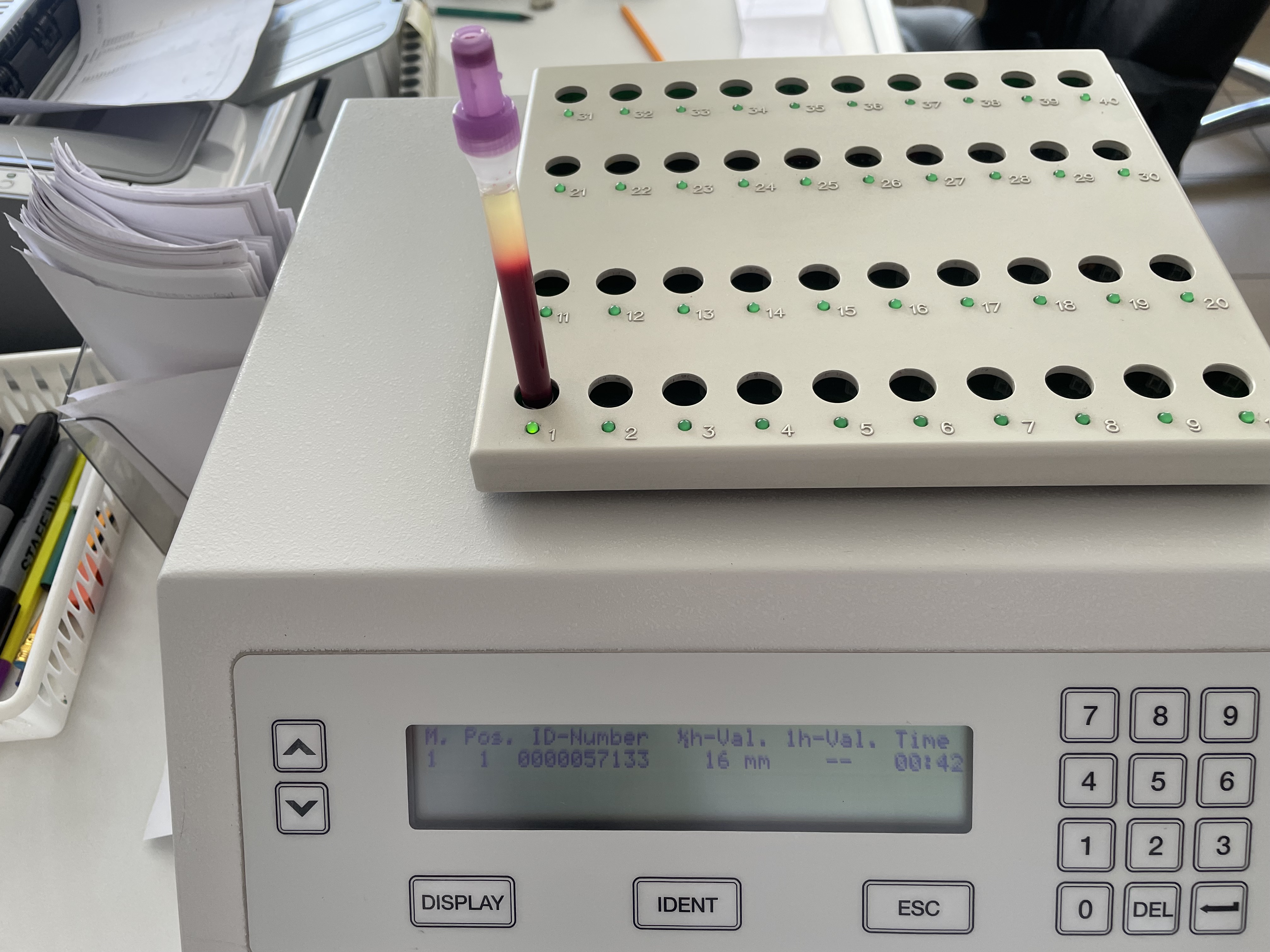
Automatic ESR analyzer with specialised tube

The erythrocyte sedimentation rate (ESR or sed rate) is the rate at which red blood cells in anticoagulated whole blood descend in a standardized tube over a period of one hour. It is a common hematology test, and is a non-specific measure of inflammation. To perform the test, anticoagulated blood is traditionally placed in an upright tube, known as a Westergren tube, and the distance which the red blood cells fall is measured and reported in millimetres at the end of one hour.

Since the introduction of automated analyzers into the clinical laboratory, the ESR test has been automatically performed.

The ESR is influenced by the aggregation of red blood cells: blood plasma proteins, mainly fibrinogen, promote the formation of red cell clusters called rouleaux or larger structures (interconnected rouleaux, irregular clusters). As according to Stokes' law the sedimentation velocity varies as the square of the object's diameter, larger aggregates settle more quickly. While aggregation already takes place at normal physiological fibrinogen levels, these tend to increase when an inflammatory process is present, leading to increased ESR.

The ESR is increased in inflammation, pregnancy, anemia, autoimmune disorders (such as rheumatoid arthritis and lupus), infections, some kidney diseases and some cancers (such as lymphoma and multiple myeloma). The ESR is decreased in polycythemia, hyperviscosity, sickle cell anemia, leukemia, chronic fatigue syndrome, low plasma protein (due to liver or kidney disease) and congestive heart failure. Although increases in immunoglobulins usually increase the ESR, very high levels can reduce it again due to hyperviscosity of the plasma. This is especially likely with IgM-class paraproteins, and to a lesser extent, IgA-class. The basal ESR is slightly higher in females.

== Stages ==
Erythrocyte sedimentation rate (ESR) is the measure of ability of erythrocytes (red blood cell) to fall through the blood plasma and accumulate together at the base of container in one hour.

There are three stages in erythrocyte sedimentation:

1. Rouleaux formation
2. Sedimentation or settling stage
3. Packing stage: 10 minutes (sedimentation slows and cells start to pack at the bottom of the tube)

In normal conditions, the red blood cells are negatively charged and therefore repel each other rather than stacking. ESR is also reduced by high blood viscosity, which slows the rate of fall.

== Causes of elevation ==
The rate of erythrocyte sedimentation is affected by both inflammatory and non-inflammatory conditions.

=== Inflammation ===
In inflammatory conditions, fibrinogen, other clotting proteins, and alpha globulin are positively charged, thus increasing the ESR. ESR begins to rise at 24 to 48 hours after the onset of acute self-limited inflammation, decreases slowly as inflammation resolves, and can take weeks to months to return to normal levels. For ESR values more than 100 mm/hour, there is a 90% probability that an underlying cause would be found upon investigation.

=== Non-inflammatory conditions ===
In non-inflammatory conditions, plasma albumin concentration, size, shape, and number of red blood cells, and the concentration of immunoglobulin can affect the ESR. Non-inflammatory conditions that can cause raised ESR include anemia, kidney failure, obesity, ageing, and female sex. ESR is also higher in women during menstruation and pregnancy. The value of ESR does not change whether dialysis is performed or not. Therefore, ESR is not a reliable measure of inflammation in those with kidney injuries as the ESR value is already elevated.

== Causes of reduction ==
An increased number of red blood cells (polycythemia) causes reduced ESR as blood viscosity increases. Hemoglobinopathy such as sickle-cell disease can have low ESR due to an improper shape of red blood cells that impairs stacking.

== Medical uses ==
=== Diagnosis ===
ESR can sometimes be useful in diagnosing diseases, such as multiple myeloma, temporal arteritis, polymyalgia rheumatica, various autoimmune diseases, systemic lupus erythematosus, rheumatoid arthritis, inflammatory bowel disease and chronic kidney diseases. In many of these cases, the ESR may exceed 100 mm/hour.

It is commonly used for a differential diagnosis for Kawasaki's disease (from Takayasu's arteritis; which would have a markedly elevated ESR) and it may be increased in some chronic infective conditions like tuberculosis and infective endocarditis. It is also elevated in subacute thyroiditis also known as DeQuervain's.

In markedly increased ESR of over 100 mm/h, infection is the most common cause (33% of cases in an American study), followed by cancer (17%), kidney disease (17%) and noninfectious inflammatory disorders (14%). Yet, in pneumonia the ESR stays under 100.

The usefulness of the ESR in current practice has been questioned by some, as it is a relatively imprecise and non-specific test compared to other available diagnostic tests. Current literature suggests that an ESR should be "obtained on all patients over the age of 50" who have an intense headache.

=== Disease severity ===
It is a component of the PCDAI (pediatric Crohn's disease activity index), an index for assessment of the severity of inflammatory bowel disease in children.

=== Monitoring response to therapy ===
The clinical usefulness of ESR is limited to monitoring the response to therapy in certain inflammatory diseases such as temporal arteritis, polymyalgia rheumatica and rheumatoid arthritis. It can also be used as a crude measure of response in Hodgkin's lymphoma. Additionally, ESR levels are used to define one of the several possible adverse prognostic factors in the staging of Hodgkin's lymphoma.

== Normal values ==
Note: mm/h. = millimeters per hour.

Westergren's original normal values (men 3 mm/h and women 7 mm/h) made no allowance for a person's age. Later studies from 1967 confirmed that ESR values tend to rise with age and to be generally higher in women. Values of the ESR also appear to be slightly higher in normal populations of African-Americans than Caucasians of both genders. Values also appear to be higher in anemic individuals than non-anemic individuals.

=== Adults ===
The widely used rule calculating normal maximum ESR values in adults (98% confidence limit) is given by a formula devised in 1983 from a study of ≈1000 individuals over the age of 20: The normal values of ESR in men is age (in years) divided by 2; for women, the normal value is age (in years) plus 10, divided by 2.

$${\rm ESR}\ (mm/h) \le \frac {{\rm Age}\ ({\it in\ years}) + 10\ ({\it if\ female})}{2}$$

Other studies confirm a dependence of ESR on age and gender, as seen in the following:

ESR reference ranges from a large 1996 study of 3,910 healthy adults (NB. these use 95% confidence intervals rather than the 98% intervals used in the study used to derive the formula above, and because of the skewness of the data, these values appear to be less than expected from the above formula):

Age	20	55	90
Men—5% exceed	12	14	19
Women—5% exceed	18	21	23

=== Children ===
Normal values of ESR have been quoted as 1 to 2 mm/h at birth, rising to 4 mm/h 8 days after delivery, and then to 17 mm/h by day 14.

Typical normal ranges quoted are:

- Newborn: 0 to 2 mm/h
- Neonatal to puberty: 3 to 13 mm/h, but other laboratories place an upper limit of 20.

== Relation to C-reactive protein ==
C-reactive protein (CRP) is an acute phase protein. Therefore, it is a better marker for acute phase reaction than ESR. While ESR and CRP generally together correlate with the degree of inflammation, this is not always the case and results may be discordant in 12.5% of the cases. Cases with raised CRP but normal ESR may demonstrate a combination of infection and some other tissue damage such as myocardial infarction, and venous thromboembolism. Such inflammation may not be enough to raise the level of ESR. Those with high ESR usually do not have demonstrable inflammation. However, in cases of low grade bacterial infections of bone and joints such as coagulase negative staphylococcus (CoNS), and systemic lupus erythematosus (SLE), ESR can be a good marker for the inflammatory process. This may be due to the production of Interferon type I that inhibits the CRP production in liver cells during SLE. CRP is a better marker for other autoimmune diseases such as polymyalgia rheumatica, giant cell arteritis, post-operative sepsis, and neonatal sepsis. ESR may be reduced in those who are taking statins and non-steroidal anti-inflammatory drugs (NSAIDs).

High ESR/Low CRP	Low ESR/High CRP
Systemic lupus erythematosis Bone and joint infections Ischemic stroke Waldenstrom's macroglobulinemia Multiple myeloma IgG4 related disease Chronic kidney disease Low serum albumin	Urinary tract, GI, lung and bloodstream infections Myocardial infarction Venous thromboembolic disease Rheumatoid arthritis Low serum albumin

== History ==
The test was invented in 1897 by the Polish pathologist Edmund Biernacki. In some parts of the world the test continues to be referred to as Biernacki's Reaction (Polish: odczyn Biernackiego, OB). In 1918, Dr. Robert Fåhræus noted that ESR differed only during pregnancy. Therefore, he suggested that ESR could be used as an indicator of pregnancy. In 1921, Dr. Alf Vilhelm Albertsson Westergren used ESR to measure the disease outcome of tuberculosis. He defined the measurement standards of ESR, which are still being used today. Robert Fåhræus and Alf Vilhelm Albertsson Westergren are eponymously remembered for the 'Fahraeus-Westergren test' (abbreviated as FW test; in the UK, usually termed Westergren test), which uses sodium citrate-anti-coagulated specimens.

== Research ==
According to a study released in 2015, a stop gain mutation in HBB gene (p. Gln40stop) was shown to be associated with ESR values in Sardinian population. The red blood cell count, whose values are inversely related to ESR, is affected in carriers of this SNP. This mutation is almost exclusive of the inhabitants of Sardinia and is a common cause of beta thalassemia.

According to a 2010 study, there is a reverse correlation between ESR and general intelligence (IQ) in Swedish males aged 18–20.
