= Giant cell arteritis =

Inflammatory disease of large blood vessels

- Other names: Temporal arteritis, cranial arteritis, Horton disease, senile arteritis, granulomatous arteritis
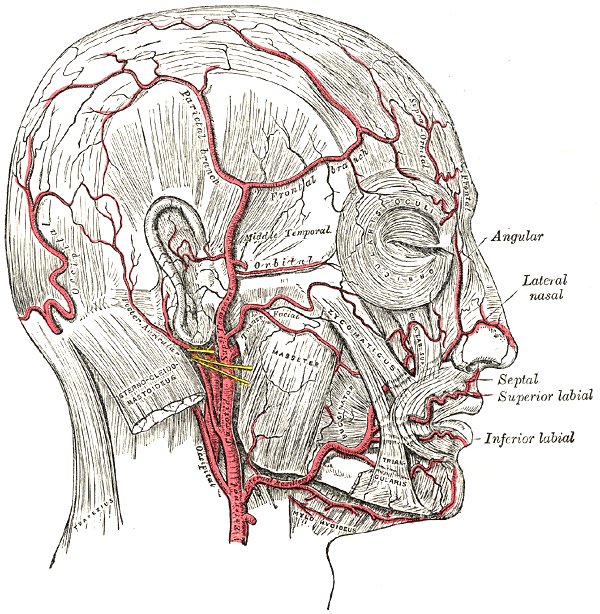
- The arteries of the face and scalp
- Specialty: Rheumatology, emergency medicine, Immunology
- Symptoms: Headache, pain over the temples, flu-like symptoms, double vision, difficulty opening the mouth
- Complications: Blindness, aortic dissection, aortic aneurysm, polymyalgia rheumatica
- Usual onset: Age greater than 50
- Causes: Inflammation of the small blood vessels within the walls of larger arteries
- Diagnostic method: Based on symptoms and blood tests, confirmed by biopsy of the temporal artery
- Differential diagnosis: Takayasu arteritis, stroke, primary amyloidosis
- Treatment: Steroids, bisphosphonates, proton-pump inhibitor
- Prognosis: Life expectancy (typically normal)
- Frequency: ~ 1 in 15,000 people a year (> 50 years old)

Giant cell arteritis (GCA), also called temporal arteritis, is an inflammatory autoimmune disease of large blood vessels. It is the most common type of systemic vasculitis affecting adults. Symptoms may include headache, pain over the temples, flu-like symptoms, double vision, and difficulty opening the mouth. Complications can include blockage of the artery to the eye with resulting blindness, as well as aortic dissection, and aortic aneurysm. GCA is frequently associated with polymyalgia rheumatica.

The cause is unknown. The underlying mechanism involves inflammation of the small blood vessels that supply the walls of larger arteries. This mainly affects arteries around the head and neck, though some in the chest may also be affected. Diagnosis is suspected based on symptoms, blood tests, and medical imaging, and confirmed by biopsy of the temporal artery. However, in about 10% of people the temporal artery is normal.

Typical treatment is with high doses of steroids such as prednisone or prednisolone. Once symptoms have resolved, the dose is decreased by about 15% per month. Once a low dose is reached, the taper is slowed further over the subsequent year. Other medications that may be recommended include bisphosphonates to prevent bone loss and a proton-pump inhibitor to prevent stomach problems.

It affects about 1 in 15,000 people over the age of 50 per year. The condition mostly occurs in those over the age of 50, being most common among those in their 70s. Females are more often affected than males. Those of northern European descent are more commonly affected. Life expectancy is typically normal. The first description of the condition occurred in 1890.

== Signs and symptoms ==
Common symptoms of giant cell arteritis include:

- bruits
- fever
- headache
- tenderness and sensitivity on the scalp
- jaw claudication (pain in jaw when chewing)
- tongue claudication (pain in tongue when chewing) and necrosis
- reduced visual acuity (blurred vision)
- acute visual loss (sudden blindness)
- diplopia (double vision)
- limb claudication
- polymyalgia rheumatica (in 50%)

The inflammation may affect blood supply to the eye; blurred vision or sudden blindness may occur. In 76% of cases involving the eye, the ophthalmic artery is involved, causing arteritic anterior ischemic optic neuropathy.

Giant cell arteritis may present with atypical or overlapping features. Early and accurate diagnosis is important to prevent ischemic vision loss. Therefore, this condition is considered a medical emergency.

While studies vary as to the exact relapse rate of giant cell arteritis, relapse of this condition can occur. It most often happens at low doses of prednisone (<20 mg/day), during the first year of treatment, and the most common signs of relapse are headache and polymyalgia rheumatica.

=== Associated conditions ===
The varicella-zoster virus (VZV) antigen was found in 74% of temporal artery biopsies that were GCA-positive, suggesting that the VZV infection may trigger the inflammatory cascade.

The disorder may co-exist (in about half of cases) with polymyalgia rheumatica (PMR), which is characterized by sudden onset of pain and stiffness in muscles (pelvis, shoulder) of the body and is seen in the elderly. GCA and PMR are so closely linked that they are often considered to be different manifestations of the same disease process. PMR usually lacks the cranial symptoms, including headache, pain in the jaw while chewing, and vision symptoms, that are present in GCA.

Giant cell arteritis can affect the aorta and lead to aortic aneurysm and aortic dissection. Up to 67% of people with GCA having evidence of an inflamed aorta, which can increase the risk of aortic aneurysm and dissection. There are arguments for the routine screening of each person with GCA for this possible life-threatening complication by imaging the aorta. Screening should be done on a case-by-case basis based on the signs and symptoms of people with GCA.

== Mechanism ==
The pathological mechanism is the result of an inflammatory cascade that is triggered by an as of yet undetermined cause resulting in dendritic cells in the vessel wall recruiting T cells and macrophages to form granulomatous infiltrates. These infiltrates erode the middle and inner layers of the arterial tunica media leading to conditions such as aneurysm and dissection. Activation of T helper 17 (Th17) cells involved with interleukin (IL) 6, IL-17, IL-21 and IL-23 play a critical part; specifically, Th17 activation leads to further activation of Th17 through IL-6 in a continuous, cyclic fashion. This pathway is suppressed with glucocorticoids, and more recently it has been found that IL-6 inhibitors also play a suppressive role.

== Diagnosis ==
=== Physical exam ===
- Palpation of the head reveals prominent temporal arteries with or without pulsation.
- The temporal area may be tender.
- Decreased pulses may be found throughout the body
- Evidence of ischemia may be noted on fundal exam.
- Bruits may be heard over the subclavian and axillary arteries

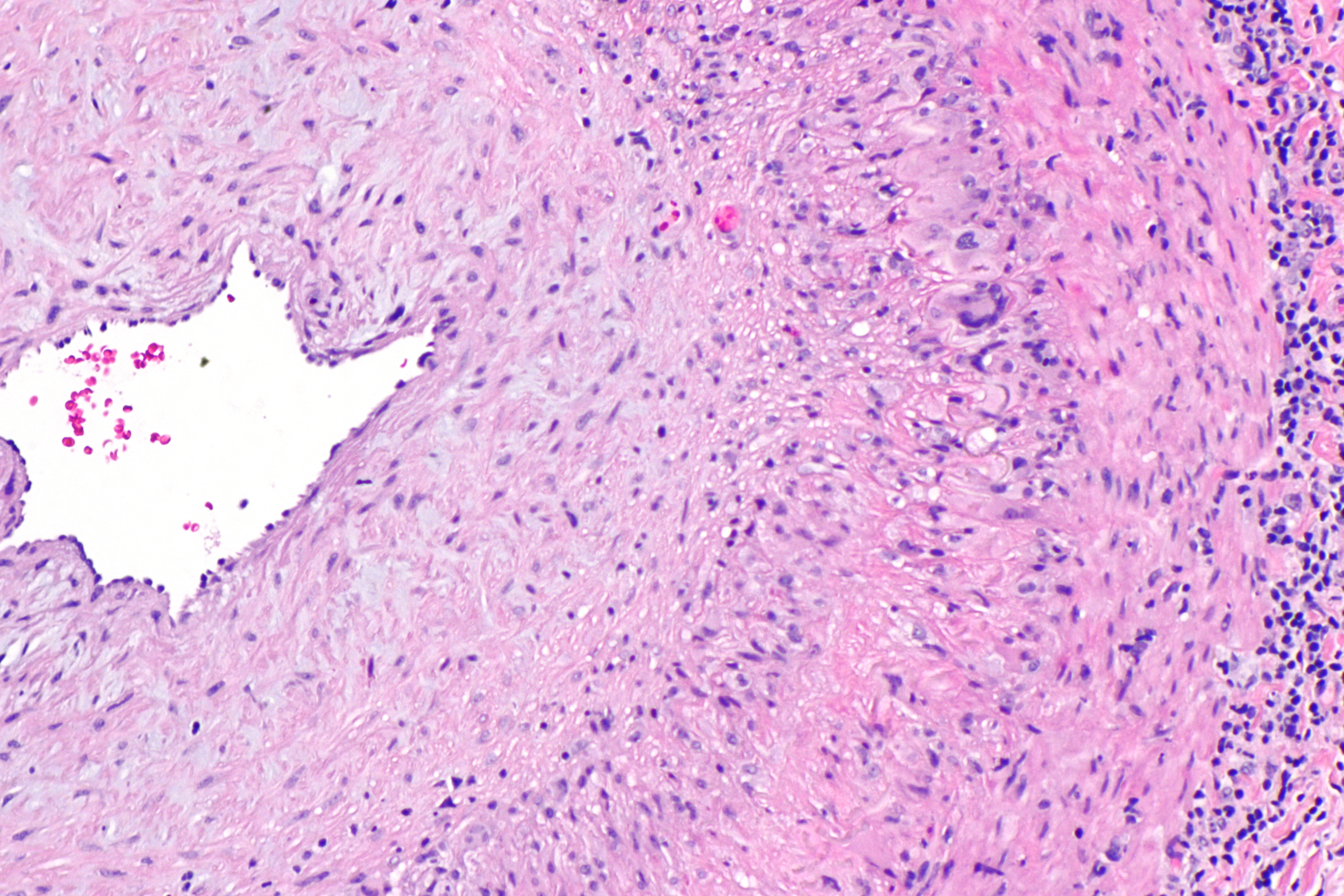
Intermediate magnification micrograph showing giant cell arteritis in a temporal artery biopsy. The arterial lumen is seen on the left. A giant cell is seen on the right at the interface between the thickened intima and media. H&E stain

=== Laboratory tests ===
- Erythrocyte sedimentation rate, an inflammatory marker, >60 mm/hour (normal 1–40 mm/hour)
- C-reactive protein, another inflammatory marker, may be elevated
- LFTs, liver function tests, are abnormal particularly raised ALP- alkaline phosphatase
- Platelets may also be elevated

=== Biopsy ===
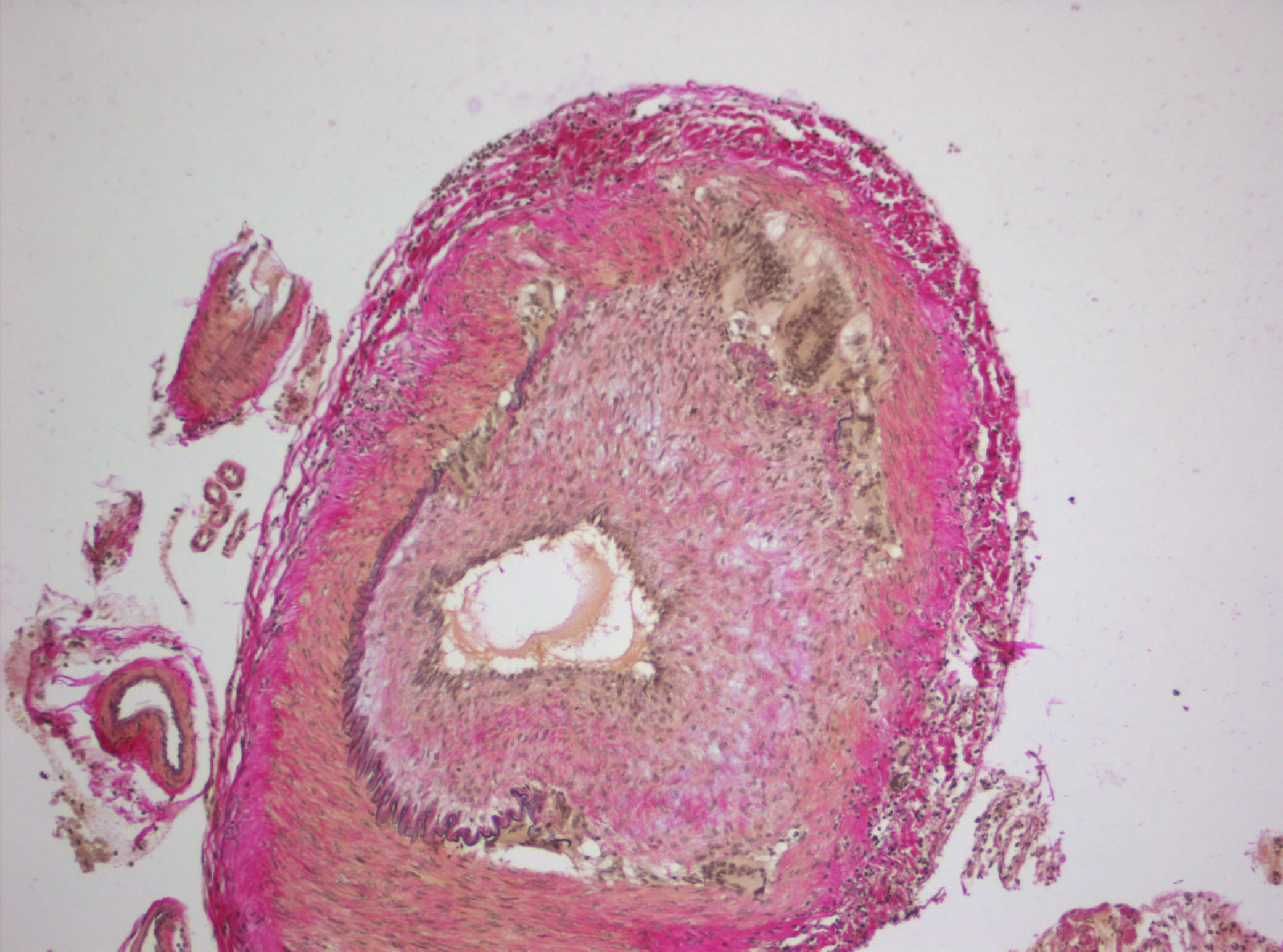
Histopathology of giant cell vasculitis in a cerebral artery. Elastica-stain.

The gold standard for diagnosing temporal arteritis is biopsy, which involves removing a small part of the vessel under local anesthesia and examining it microscopically for giant cells infiltrating the tissue. However, a negative result does not definitively rule out the diagnosis; since the blood vessels are involved in a patchy pattern, there may be unaffected areas on the vessel and the biopsy might have been taken from these parts. Unilateral biopsy of a 1.5–3 cm length is 85–90% sensitive (1 cm is the minimum). Characterised as intimal hyperplasia and medial granulomatous inflammation with elastic lamina fragmentation with a CD4+ predominant T cell infiltrate, currently biopsy is only considered confirmatory for the clinical diagnosis, or one of the diagnostic criteria.

=== Medical imaging ===
Radiological examination of the temporal artery with ultrasound yields a halo sign. Contrast-enhanced brain MRI and CT are generally negative in this disorder. Recent studies have shown that 3T MRI using super high resolution imaging and contrast injection can non-invasively diagnose this disorder with high specificity and sensitivity. Temporal artery thickening on imaging has been demonstrated to have the highest positive likelihood ratios for GCA when compared with other non invasive diagnostic tests.

=== Early recognition ===
Women and men approximately 45 years old and over who suffer from several complaints (at least 5 of the 16 symptoms) listed below could have giant cell arteritis.

- Fatigue and apathy
- Stiffness in joints and/or muscles
- Painful jaws when chewing
- Sensitive scalp
- Physical malaise and/or weakness
- Bloated arteries of the temples
- Headaches, migraine
- Tongue problems
- Bleakness, depression
- Changed eyesight
- Poor or lack of appetite
- Reduced eyesight, blindness
- Unusual loss of weight
- A temperature
- Unusual perspiration
- Night sweats

== Treatment ==
GCA is considered a medical emergency due to the potential of irreversible vision loss.

Corticosteroids, typically high-dose prednisone (1 mg/kg/day), should be started as soon as the diagnosis is suspected (even before the diagnosis is confirmed by biopsy) to prevent irreversible blindness secondary to ophthalmic artery occlusion. Steroids do not prevent the diagnosis from later being confirmed by biopsy, although certain changes in the histology may be observed towards the end of the first week of treatment and are more difficult to identify after a couple of months. The dose of corticosteroids is generally slowly tapered over 12–18 months. Oral steroids are at least as effective as intravenous steroids, except in the treatment of acute visual loss where intravenous steroids appear to offer significant benefit over oral steroids. Short-term side effects of prednisone are uncommon but can include mood changes, avascular necrosis, and an increased risk of infection. Some of the side effects associated with long-term use include weight gain, diabetes mellitus, osteoporosis, avascular necrosis, glaucoma, cataracts, cardiovascular disease, and an increased risk of infection.

It is unclear whether adding a small amount of aspirin is beneficial.

Injections of tocilizumab may also be used. Tocilizumab is a humanized antibody that targets the interleukin-6 receptor, which is a key cytokine involved in the progression of GCA. Tocilizumab has been found to be effective at minimizing both recurrence, and flares of GCA when used both on its own and with corticosteroids. Long-term use of tocilizumab requires further investigation. Tocilizumab may increase the risk of gastrointestinal perforation and infections, however it does not appear that there are more risks than using corticosteroids.

== Epidemiology ==
Giant cell arteritis typically only occurs in those over the age of 50; particularly those in their 70s. It affects about 1 in 15,000 people over the age of 50 per year. It is more common in women than in men, by a ratio of 2:1, and more common in those of Northern European descent, as well as in those residing further from the Equator. Roughly 1 in 5 people with polymyalgia rheumatica also have giant cell arteritis.

== Disease impact ==
Giant cell arteritis and its treatment impact on people's lives because of symptoms, adverse effects of GCs and disruption to normal life. People with GCA have previously ranked "losing sight in both eyes permanently", "having intense or severe pain" and "feeling weak, tired or exhausted" as important quality of life domains.

== Terminology ==
The terms "giant cell arteritis" and "temporal arteritis" are sometimes used interchangeably, because of the frequent involvement of the temporal artery. However, other large vessels such as the aorta can be involved. Giant-cell arteritis is also known as "cranial arteritis" and "Horton's disease". The name (giant cell arteritis) reflects the type of inflammatory cell involved.
